= Coyrecup Lake =

Ephemeral salt lake in Western Australia

- Location in Western Australia
- Interactive map of Coyrecup Lake
- Location: Great Southern, Western Australia
- Coordinates: 33°42′30″S 117°50′07″E
- Type: saline
- Primary inflows: Groundwater and surface runoff
- Catchment area: 194,165 ha (479,790 acres)
- Basin countries: Australia
- Surface area: 453 ha (1,120 acres)
- Max. depth: 3 m (9.8 ft)
- Water volume: 4,533,000 m^{3} (160,100,000 cu ft) (per metre of depth)

Coyrecup Lake is an ephemeral salt lake in Coyrecup, in the Great Southern region of Western Australia located approximately 25 km (16 mi) east of the town of Katanning and about 302 km (188 mi) south east of Perth. The lake is situated within the Coyrecup Nature Reserve, and is part of the Blackwood River drainage basin and the Hardy Estuary-Coblinine River catchment.

== Description ==
The oval shaped lake with an area of 453 ha (1,120 acres) is over a dissected plateau of gneiss and granite bedrock and laterite of the Yilgarn craton and is part of a floodplain that is a few kilometres wide. There are Quaternary and Cainozoic alluvial and lacustrine deposits on the valley floors that underlie the lake with variable layers of sand, silt and clay. The landscape is composed mostly of gently undulating rises to low hills with some abrupt breakaways. The remaining native vegetation is dominated by of proteaceous heath scrub, with many endemic species, although the bulk of the surrounding land has been cleared for cereal cropping.

Inflow to the lake arrives via an approximately 20 km (12 mi) long watercourse that is poorly defined arriving to the lake from the north east and from Little Creek with a length of approximately 15 km (9.3 mi) coming from the south. The lake is semi-permanent and will often dry out for several months over summer, usually one year in every three. The depth of the water can be as much as 3 m (9.8 ft) when the lake is full but averages around 1.7 m (5 ft 7 in) in spring.

The catchment area occupies an area of 194,165 ha (479,790 acres) of mostly cleared agricultural land. It is the headwaters of the Colbinine River and makes up one third of the Dumbleyung Lake basin.

The lake was used for boating in the early twentieth century.

In 1980, 44 small islands were constructed while the lake was dry. The islands were arranged in two clusters, one north of the inflow channel and one to the south. The islands were to act as nesting and refuge areas for waterbirds.

The lake is one of the five sites in the Avon-Wheatbelt area recognised as a DIWA wetland.

== Flora ==
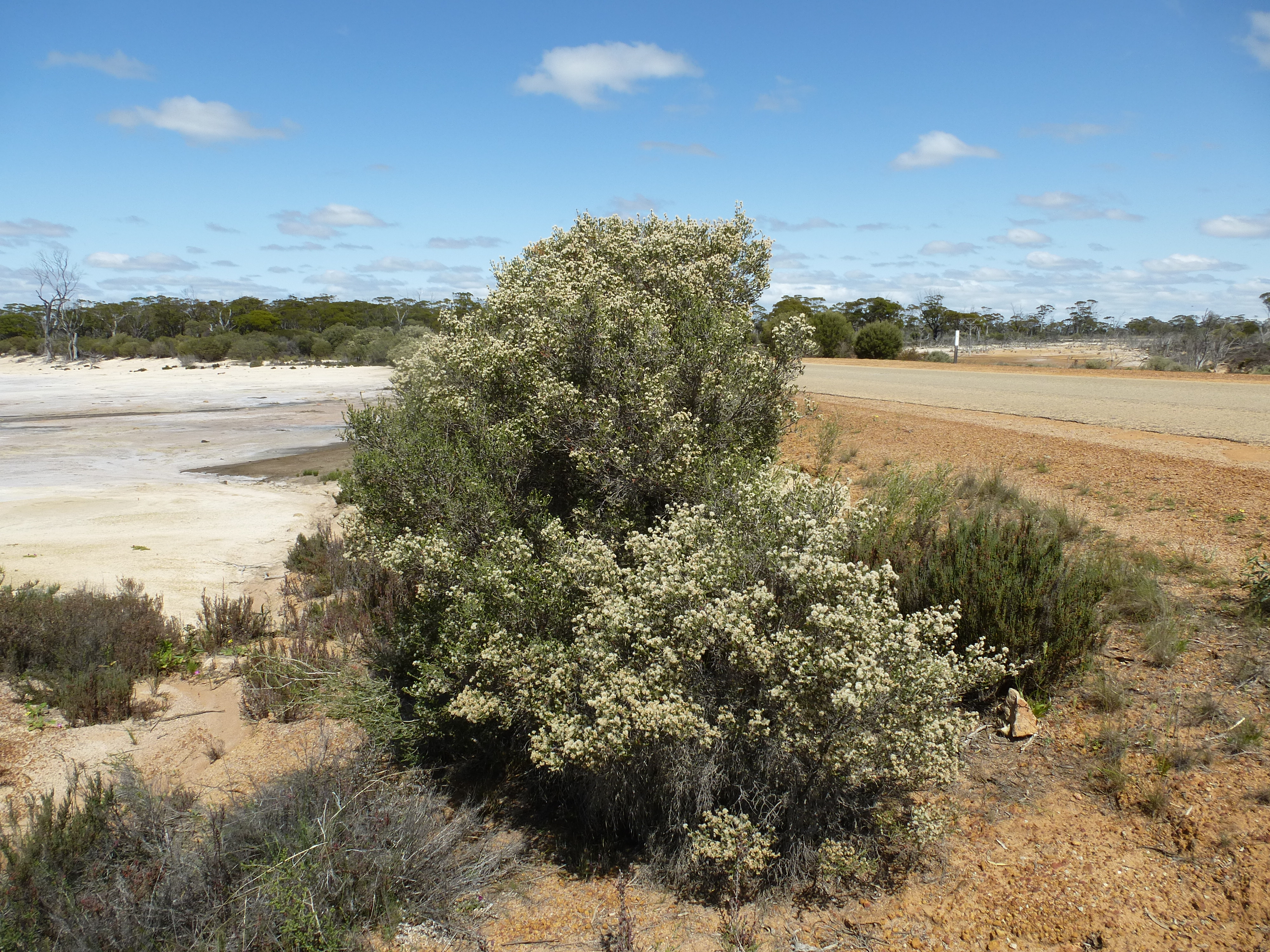
Melaleuca halmaturorum that are found in the lake basin

The lake is part of the Dumbleyung Vegetation System, which belongs in the South-west Botanical Province. The lake contains a dense aquatic layer of vegetation over the channel draining into the lake containing Ruppia polycarpa and species of Chara alga. The littoral vegetation surrounding the lake is composed of low shrubland with many samphire species, dominated by Halosarcia pergranulata, Halosarcia lepidosperma and Sarcocornia quinqueflora. This is surrounded by remnant low open forest and closed scrub. The thickets of closed scrub and low open forest fringing the lake are mostly populated by Casuarina obesa, Melaleuca strobophylla and Disphyma crassifolium, with Melaleuca halmaturorum commonly found in the lake basin. Rare flora species known to be found in the nature reserve are Dryandra porrecta and Blennospora phlegmatocarpa.

== Fauna ==
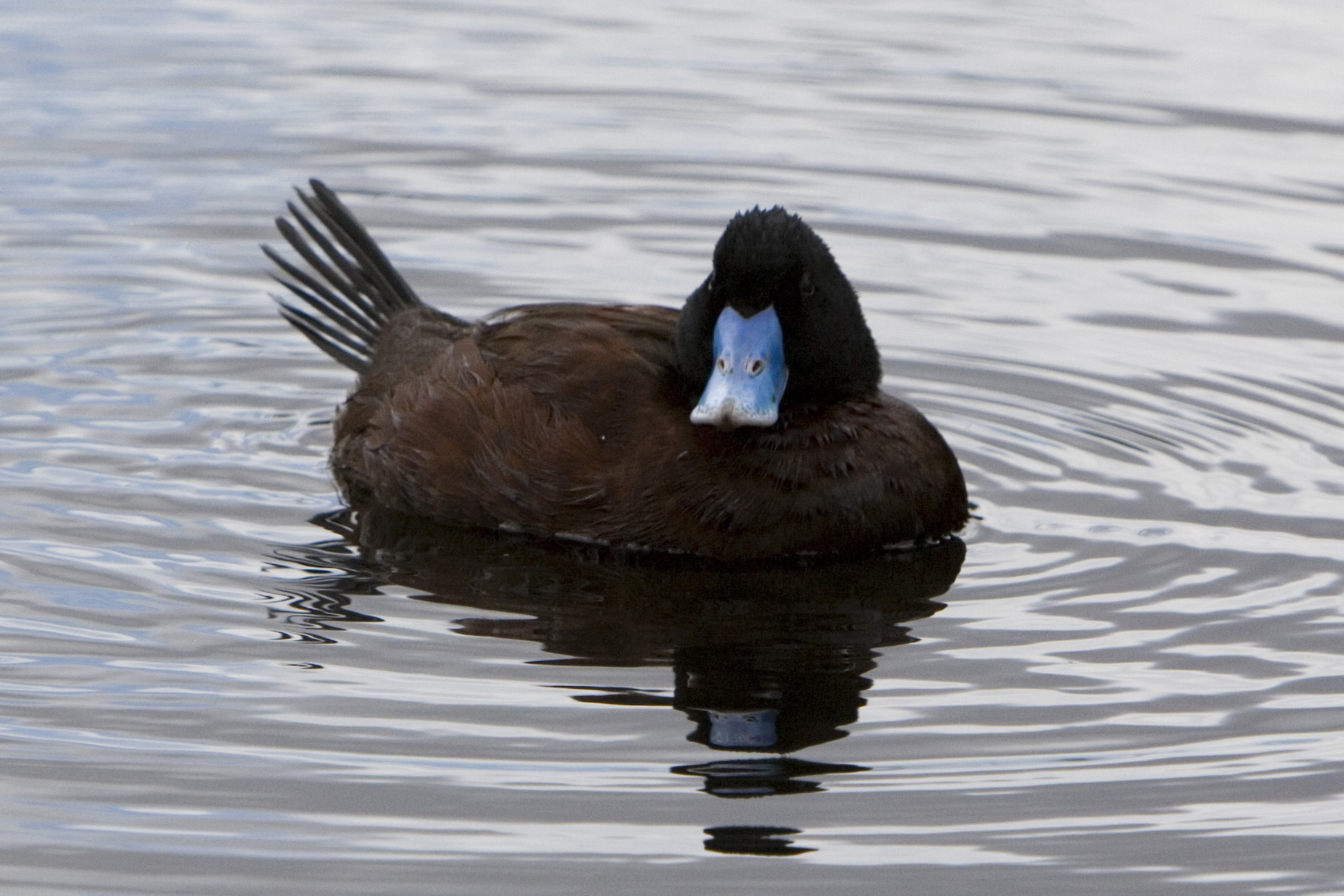
Blue-billed duck are found in the lake

A total of 70 taxa of aquatic invertebrates have been collected from the lake over the past few years. There are both salt-tolerant freshwater species and halophile species that prefer higher salinity. About half the species collected are macroinvertebrates and half microinvertebrates.

The lake has a significant bird population identified, and can support a population of tens of thousands. A total of 41 species are known in the lake area and the most abundant wetland species include Australian shelduck, black swan, grey teal, pink-eared duck, pacific black duck and maned duck. Other important species found include the most endangered waterfowl species in Australia, the freckled duck and blue-billed duck. The area is used as breeding habitat by at least five species of waterbirds.

== See also ==
- List of lakes of Australia § Western Australia
