= Coyrecup =

Coyrecup may refer to:

- Coyrecup, Western Australia, a locality of the Shire of Katanning
  - Coyrecup Lake, located in the above locality
  - Coyrecup Nature Reserve, centred around Coyrecup Lake
