= Ewlyamartup =

Ewlyamartup may refer to:

- Ewlyamartup, Western Australia, a locality of the Shire of Katanning
  - Lake Ewlyamartup, a lake in the above locality
  - Ewlyamartup Creek, a river running through the locality and the lake
