= Coblinine =

Coblinine may refer to:

- Coblinine, Western Australia, a locality of the Shire of Katanning
- Coblinine Nature Reserve, in Western Australia
  - Coblinine River, a river running through the above locality and nature reserve
