= South Datatine, Western Australia =

Locality in the Shire of Katanning, Western Australia

South Datatine
- Interactive map of South Datatine
- Coordinates: 33.48472°S 117.86528°E
- Country: Australia
- State: Western Australia
- LGA: Shire of Katanning
- Location: 250 km (160 mi) SE of Perth; 170 km (110 mi) N of Albany; 33 km (21 mi) NE of Katanning

Government
  - State electorate: Roe
  - Federal division: O'Connor

Area
  - Total: 89.7 km^{2} (34.6 sq mi)

Population
  - Total: 20 (SAL 2016)
- Postcode: 6317
Localities around South Datatine
Datatine	Datatine	Nyabing
Coblinine	South Datatine	Nyabing
Coblinine	Badgebup	Nyabing

South Datatine is a rural locality of the Shire of Katanning in the Great Southern region of Western Australia.

== History ==
South Datatine is located on the traditional land of the Koreng people of the Noongar nation.

== Nature reserve ==
The southern end of the unnamed WA19075 Nature Reserve protrudes into South Datatine, with the majority of the reserve being located in Datatine to the north. It was gazetted on 26 September 1969, has a size of 1.36 square kilometres (0.53 mi^{2}), and is located within the Avon Wheatbelt bioregion.
