= Pterostylis brunneola =

Giant snail orchid

Scientific classification
- Kingdom: Plantae
- Clade: Tracheophytes
- Clade: Angiosperms
- Clade: Monocots
- Order: Asparagales
- Family: Orchidaceae
- Subfamily: Orchidoideae
- Tribe: Cranichideae
- Genus: Pterostylis
- Species: P. brunneola

Binomial name
- Pterostylis brunneola D.L.Jones & C.J.French

Species of orchid

Pterostylis brunneola, commonly known as the giant snail orchid, is a species of orchid endemic to the south-west of Western Australia. Both flowering and non-flowering plants have a large rosette of leaves flat on the ground and flowering plants have a single distinctive white flower with pale fawn stripes and have leaves on the flowering spike. This species often forms large colonies, sometimes with Caladenia species.

== Description ==
Pterostylis brunneola is a terrestrial, perennial, deciduous, herb with an underground tuber and a large rosette of leaves 20–55 mm (0.8–2 in) in diameter. Flowering plants have a single pale fawn and white flower 12–16 mm (0.5–0.6 in) long and 7–12 mm (0.3–0.5 in) wide on a flowering stem 90–170 mm (4–7 in) high. There are two or three stem leaves 10–15 mm (0.4–0.6 in) long and 5–8 mm (0.2–0.3 in) wide on the flowering stem. The dorsal sepal and petals are fused, forming a hood or "galea" over the column and the dorsal sepal has a blunt point. The lateral sepals are held close to the galea and have erect, thread-like tips 10–20 mm (0.4–0.8 in) long. The labellum is broad but not visible from outside the flower. Flowering occurs from July to September.

== Taxonomy and naming ==
Pterostylis brunneola was first formally described in 2014 by David Jones and Christopher French from a specimen collected south of Narrogin and the description was published in Australian Orchid Review. The species had previously been known as Pterostylis sp. 'giant'. The specific epithet (brunneola) is a Latin word meaning "brownish", referring to the colour of the flowers.

== Distribution and habitat ==
The giant snail orchid grows near Toolibin Lake in sandy soil under species of Banksia and Allocasuarina in the Avon Wheatbelt, Esperance Plains and Jarrah Forest biogeographic regions.

== Conservation ==
Pterostylis brunneola is listed as "not threatened" by the Government of Western Australia Department of Parks and Wildlife.
