= Toolibin Lake =

Lake in Western Australia

- Location in Western Australia
- Interactive map of Toolibin Lake
- Location: Wheatbelt, Western Australia
- Coordinates: 32°55′15″S 117°36′28″E
- Type: perched freshwater or brackish wooded swamp
- Primary inflows: local surface runoff
- Primary outflows: overflows into other wetlands in the headwaters of the Arthur River
- Catchment area: Upper Blackwood River
- Basin countries: Australia
- Max. length: 2 km (1.2 mi)
- Max. width: 1.7 km (1.1 mi)
- Surface area: 3 km^{2} (1.2 sq mi)
- Max. depth: 2 m (6 ft 7 in)
- Surface elevation: 300 m (980 ft)

Ramsar Wetland
- Designated: 7 June 1990
- Reference no.: 483

Toolibin Lake is a seasonal fresh to brackish water perched lake or wooded swamp, in south-western Australia. The lake is contained with a 493-hectare (1,218-acre) nature reserve and it is located about 200 kilometres (124 mi) south-east of Perth, in the Shire of Narrogin, and 40 kilometres (25 mi) east of the town of Narrogin, in the Wheatbelt region of Western Australia. The lake is listed by the Australian Government as a threatened ecological community under the Environment Protection and Biodiversity Conservation Act 1999.

== Description ==
The lake lies in the catchment of the upper Blackwood River at an altitude of 300 metres (984 ft) above mean sea level. It is about 300 hectares (740 acres) in area and 2 kilometres (1.2 mi) in diameter, has a maximum depth of 2 metres (6.6 ft), and is one of the last remaining inland freshwater lakes found in south-western Australia. It is one of a chain of wetlands occupying a palaeodrainage valley forming part of the northern Arthur River system. Most of it is covered with a woodland of water tolerant tree species, with a large open area on the eastern side. Many other Wheatbelt wetlands formerly supported a vegetation community and ecosystem similar to that of Toolibin, but clearing for agriculture has resulted in most such sites becoming saline with a concomitant loss of emergent vegetation. Toolibin is the only major lake in the catchment that has not become completely saline.

Toolibin Lake lies in a low rainfall area of the Wheatbelt with an average annual rainfall of 400 mm, mainly falling in May–August, with annual evaporation of 1800 mm. It usually only holds water at certain times of year; sometimes drying out completely for several years; sometimes holding water for extended periods.

=== Ramsar site ===
Toolibin Lake is recognised as a wetland of international importance under the Ramsar Convention on Wetlands, under which it was designated Ramsar Site 483 on 7 June 1990. The Ramsar site includes the entire area of the lake with some adjacent land on the northern, western and southern sides of the lake added in 2001 since the original site nomination, ensuring a buffer zone of at least 100 m width around most of the lake.

== Flora and fauna ==
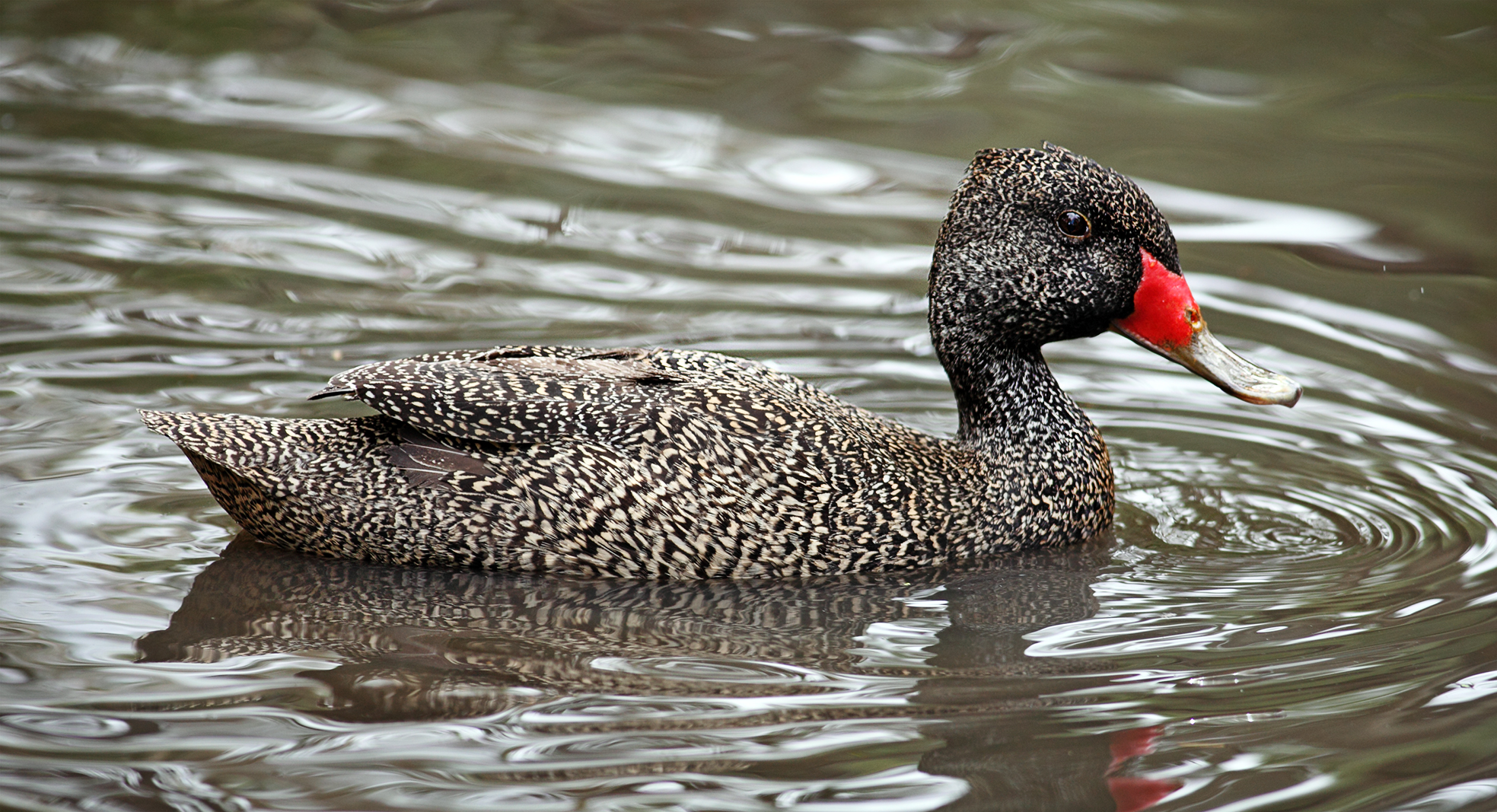
Freckled duck (Stictonetta naevosa)

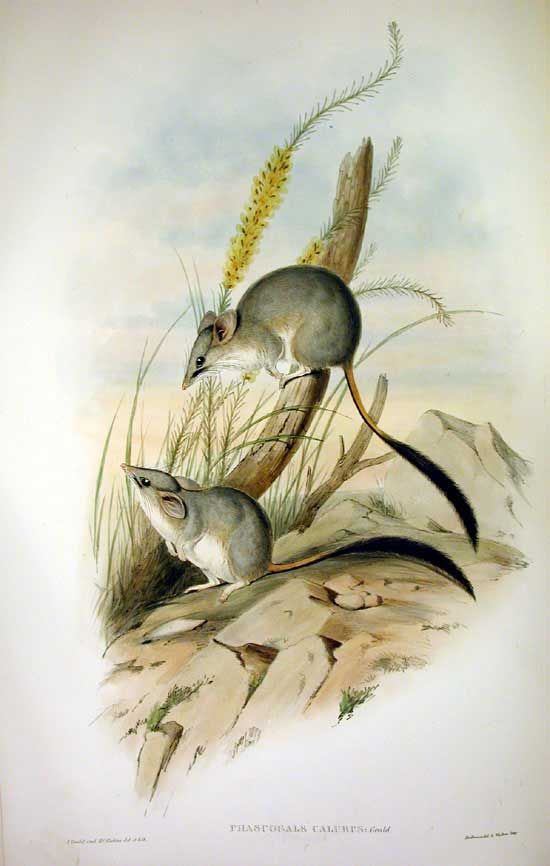
Red-tailed phascogale

Toolibin is the only remaining example in Southwest Australia of a wetland with extensive living thickets of swamp sheoak and the paperbark Melaleuca strobophylla on the lake fringes and bed - one of the main wetland types in the region prior to agricultural development there. Flooded gum, acorn banksia and rock sheoak woodland occur on the higher ground and deep sands surrounding the lake. The vegetation includes submerged aquatic plants and sedges around the lake.

The vegetation community provides habitat, now rare in the central wheatbelt, for woodland birds and other animals. Toolibin and its environs support more breeding waterbird species — up to 25, including the rare freckled duck, cormorants, egrets, night herons and spoonbills — than any other inland wetland in south-western Australia. It also supports a population of the threatened red-tailed phascogale.

== Conservation ==
The main threats to Toolibin’s ecological community are salinisation and waterlogging due to clearing of the catchment for dry-land agriculture, particularly wool and cereal grain production; eutrophication caused by run-off containing agricultural fertilizers; invasive weeds changing the structure of the ecosystem and reducing natural vegetation available for food and shelter for animals; and grazing of regenerating seedlings by kangaroos, livestock and rabbits.

Actions to recover the environmental values of the lake and its catchment include the reduction of recharge – including revegetation and the protection of remnant vegetation; changes in farming methods, such as contour farming and the use of perennial grasses for grazing; the management of surface water in the catchment to reduce waterlogging of farmland, to decrease the salinity of water entering the lake, and to decrease salt loading of the lake; and groundwater pumping to lower the water table beneath the lake.
