= Lake Ewlyamartup =

Salt lake in Western Australia

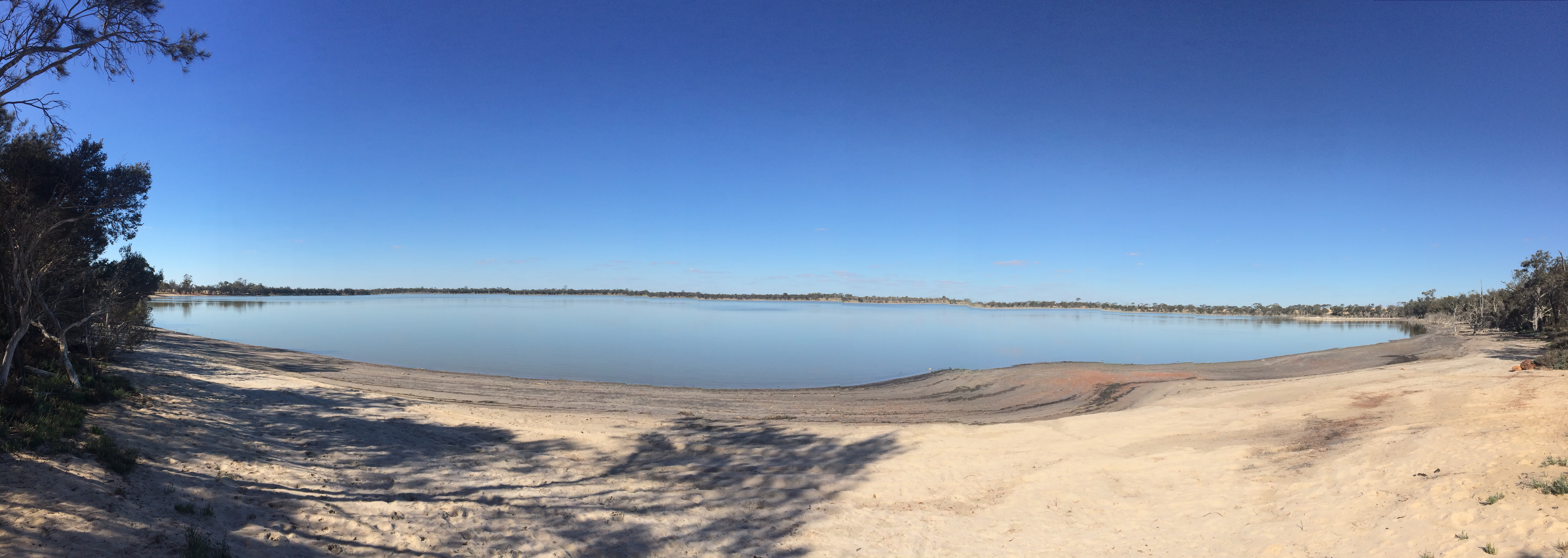
- Lake Ewlyamartup 2018

- Location in Western Australia
- Interactive map of Lake Ewlyamartup
- Location: Great Southern, Western Australia
- Coordinates: 33°41′36″S 117°44′25″E
- Type: Saline
- Primary inflows: Groundwater and surface runoff
- Catchment area: 50,700 ha (125,000 acres)
- Basin countries: Australia
- Surface area: 88 to 100 ha (220 to 250 acres)

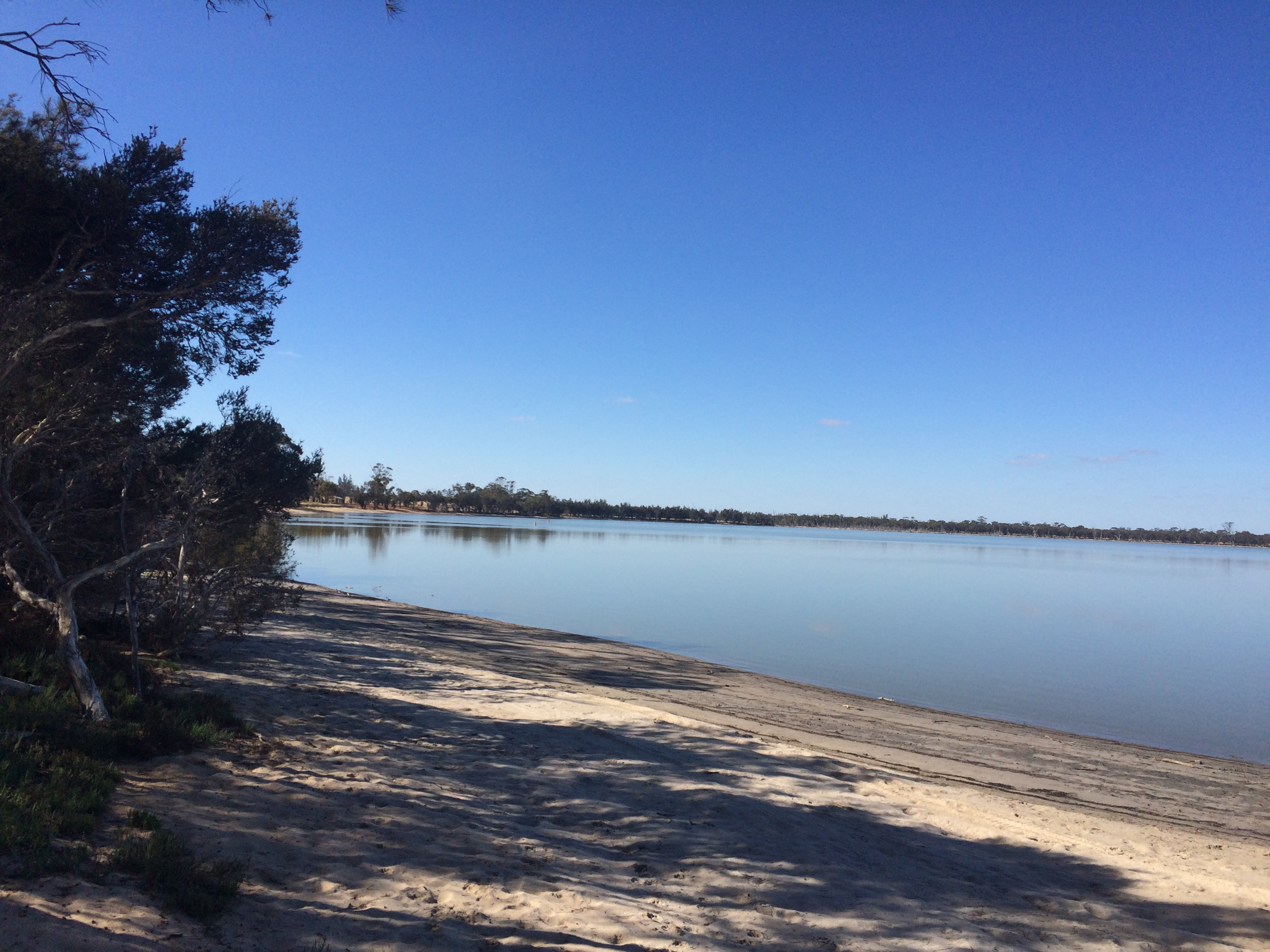
Lake Ewlyamartup southern shoreline

Lake Ewlyamartup is an ephemeral salt lake in the Great Southern region of Western Australia located approximately 17 km (11 mi) east of the town of Katanning and about 294 km (183 mi) south east of Perth, in the locality of Ewlyamartup.

== Description ==
The 50,700 ha (125,000-acre) catchment area has an average rainfall of 478 mm (18.8 in) per annum and an evaporation rate of 1,826 mm (71.9 in) per annum. The landscape is a mixture of saline and fresh lakes and swamps with lunettes, dunes and swales on aeolian and lacustrine deposits and alluvium over granite based rocks. The lake is situated on major ancient drainage lines.

The lake was once a freshwater source but land clearing has led to salinity. In 2010 the water quality of the lake had deteriorated and the salinity level was three times that of sea water.

The inflow comes from Ewlyamartup Creek on the northern end of the lake. In years when the lake overflows the water flows west from the creek instead of south into the lake and eventually discharges into the Coblinine River.

== History ==
The traditional owners are the Koreng group of the Noongar peoples. The name of the lake means "come now to this place where there is a water hole associated with a leg". A sacred site is situated on the lakes outskirts and was once an Indigenous camp ground hundreds of years ago. The lake provided fresh water and the Noongar would fish and hunt kangaroo in the area.

James Stirling and John Septimus Roe explored the area in 1835 while travelling from Perth to Albany. Sandalwood cutters worked the area in 1870 and by 1889 settlers arrived to pursue agricultural activities.

The catchment area was extensively cleared, with only 9% of remnant vegetation remaining.

A dam was built along the north western margin of the lake in 1912 by excavating. It had a capacity of 4,650 cu yd (3,560 m^{3}) but there was little water in the lake to flow into the dam.

Lake Ewlyamartup has sources of inflow but no outflow and can become silted up. In 2010 the local community removed 20,000 m^{3} (710,000 cu ft) of nutrient rich sludge from the lake and planted 100,000 trees in the catchment area. Since then another 150,00 trees have been planted.

The lake is used for recreational purposes such as bird watching and camping. At times when the water levels are high enough it is used for canoeing, kayaking, sailing, swimming, water-skiing and windsurfing.

Many facilities are found at the lake, including parking area, picnic tables and seating, shelter, barbeques, toilets, boat ramp, bird hide and camping areas.

== Flora ==
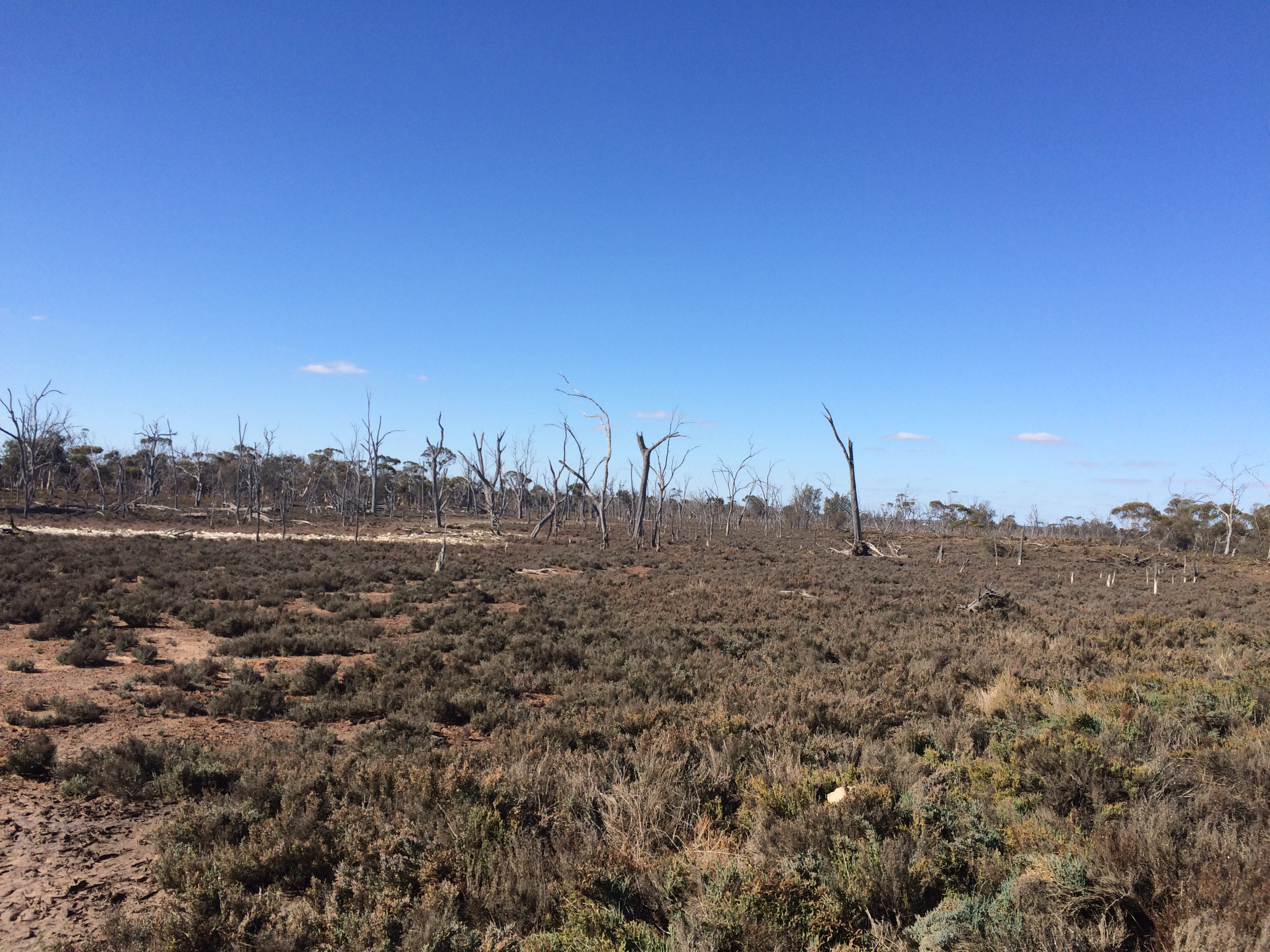
Lake Ewlyamartup fringing vegetation

The area is part of the Dumbleyung Vegetation System, which is mostly gently undulating with scattered cappings of laterite in the north with salt-flats and lakes found in the larger valleys often with sand deposits. The system is composed of open woodland areas of york gum, red morrell, salmon gum and wandoo while the salt-flats have mallees, teatree and samphire. Other species found on the fringes of the lake include Eucalyptus occidentalis, Eucalyptus spathulata, Allocasuarina huegeliana, Casuarina obesa, Banksia prionotes, Melaleuca pritzelii and Verticordia huegelii var. tridens.

== Fauna ==
Fauna around the lake include 8 species of frogs, 42 of reptiles and 26 mammals. The lake is rich in bird life, with 95 species of bird recorded around the lake, including the endangered hooded plover and freckled duck. Other species seen around the lake are chestnut teal, banded stilt, common sandpiper, red-necked avocet, red-kneed dotterel, common greenshank, wood sandpiper and black-winged stilt.

== See also ==
- List of lakes of Australia § Western Australia
