= Coyrecup, Western Australia =

Locality in the Shire of Katanning, Western Australia

Coyrecup
- Interactive map of Coyrecup
- Coordinates: 33.67806°S 117.83000°E
- Country: Australia
- State: Western Australia
- LGA: Shire of Katanning
- Location: 264 km (164 mi) SE of Perth; 152 km (94 mi) N of Albany; 25 km (16 mi) E of Katanning

Government
  - State electorate: Roe
  - Federal division: O'Connor

Area
  - Total: 220.1 km^{2} (85.0 sq mi)

Population
  - Total: 31 (SAL 2021)
- Postcode: 6317
Localities around Coyrecup
Coblinine	Badgebup	Badgebup
Ewlyamartup	Coyrecup	Nyabing
Broomehill East	Broomehill East	Pallinup

Coyrecup is a rural locality of the Shire of Katanning in the Great Southern region of Western Australia. The Coyrecup Nature Reserve, centred around Coyrecup Lake, is located within Coyrecup.

== History ==
Coyrecup is located on the traditional land of the Koreng people of the Noongar nation.

Coyrecup was once a siding on the Katanning to Pingrup railway line. The siding opened in 1912, under the name of Wurnup, was renamed to Coyrecup in 1922, and closed permanently in 1985.

The historic Holland Track passes through Coyrecup, following the Katanning-Nyabing Road, on its way to Coolgardie.

== Nature reserve ==
The Coyrecup Nature Reserve was gazetted on 28 April 1967, has a size of 11.47 square kilometres (4.43 mi^{2}), and is located within the Avon Wheatbelt and Mallee bioregions.
