= Coblinine Nature Reserve =

Nature reserve in Western Australia

- IUCN category Ia (strict nature reserve)
- Location within Western Australia
- Location: Western Australia
- Nearest city: Katanning
- Coordinates: 33.413769°S 117.762446°E
- Area: 4,167 ha (16.09 sq mi)
- Established: 1908

The Coblinine Nature Reserve is located in the Avon Wheatbelt bioregion of Western Australia. It stretches along the Coblinine River, from its southern end east of Katanning, to Dumbleyung Lake.

It was gazetted on 4 September 1908 and has a size of 41.67 square kilometres (16.09 mi^{2}).

The nature reserve stretches through the localities of Ewlyamartup and Coblinine in the Shire of Katanning through Bullock Hills, Datatine and Dumbleyung in the Shire of Dumbleyung.

The name Coblinine is of Koreng Noongar origin, meaning "all of the stomach intestines and navel, river-like, are here sitting".
