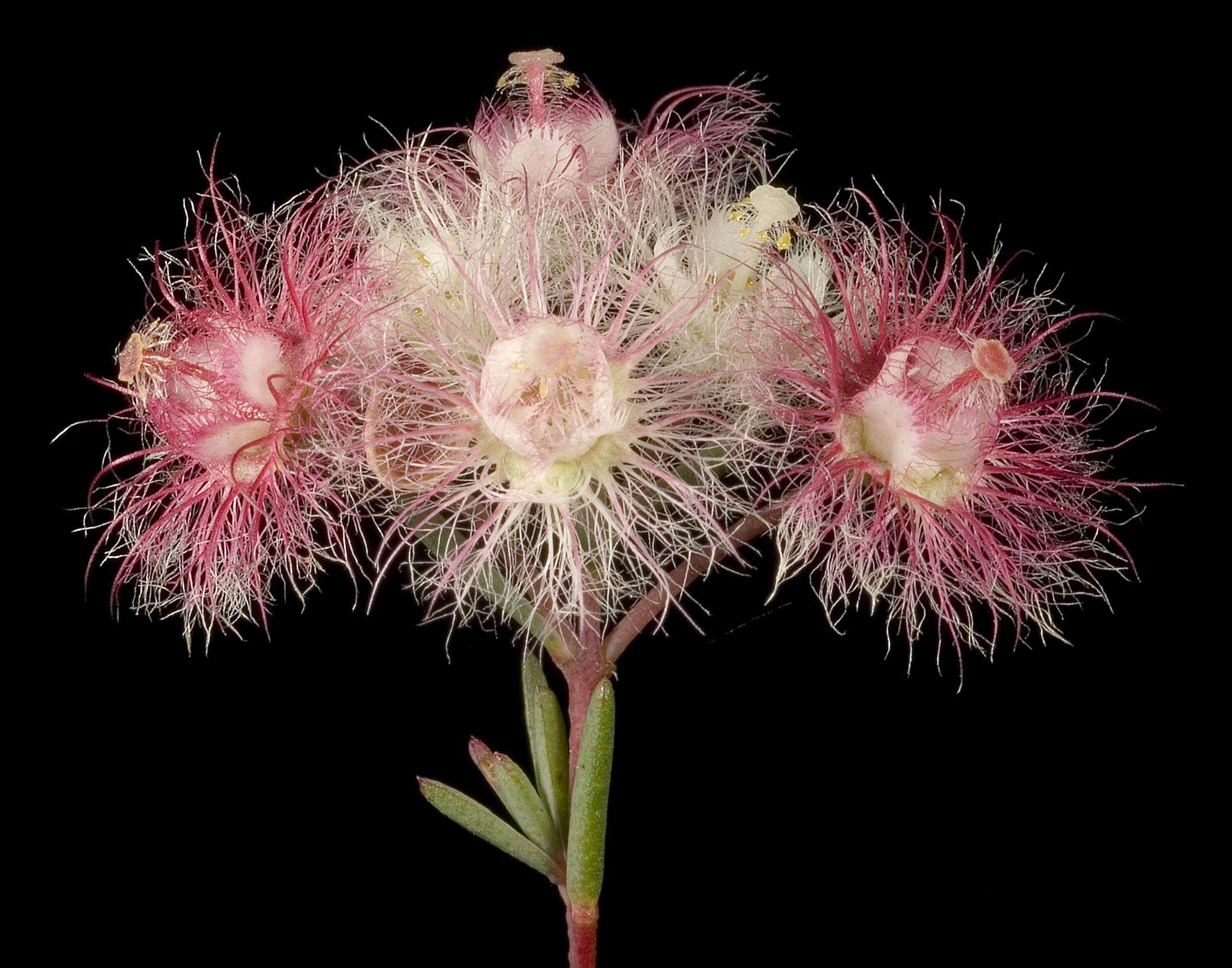

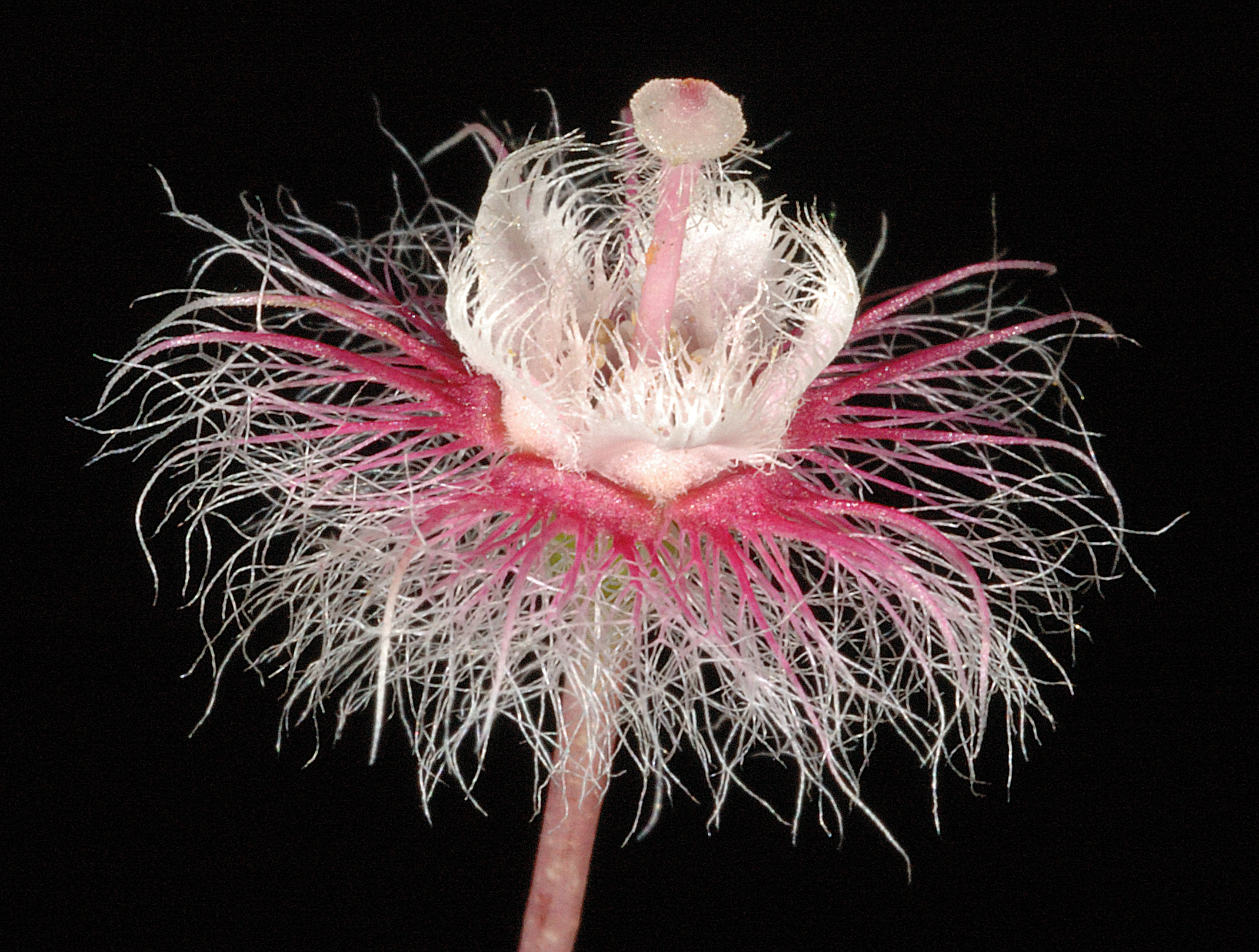

Scientific classification
- Kingdom: Plantae
- Clade: Tracheophytes
- Clade: Angiosperms
- Clade: Eudicots
- Clade: Rosids
- Order: Myrtales
- Family: Myrtaceae
- Genus: Verticordia
- Species: V. huegelii Endl.
- Variety: V. h. var. huegelii

Trinomial name
- Verticordia huegelii var. huegelii

= Verticordia huegelii var. huegelii =

Variety of flowering plant

Verticordia huegelii var. huegelii, commonly known as variegated featherflower, is a flowering plant in the myrtle family, Myrtaceae and is endemic to the south-west of Western Australia. It is an upright, slender or bushy shrub, with creamish-white flowers turning pink or reddish maroon as they age, giving the plant a variegated appearance. It is similar to Verticordia huegelii var. decumbens but is more upright than that variety and lacks a lignotuber.

== Description ==
Verticordia huegelii var. huegelii is a shrub which usually grows to 0.5 m (2 ft) high but some forms, especially one from the Darling Range, grow to 0.9 m (3 ft) high and 10–45 cm (4–20 in) wide. Its leaves are linear to club-shaped, semi-circular in cross-section and 2–8 mm (0.08–0.3 in) long.

The flowers are unscented and arranged in rounded groups near the ends of the branches, each flower on a stalk 4–11 mm (0.2–0.4 in) long. The floral cup is top-shaped, 2–3 mm (0.08–0.1 in) long, smooth and partly hairy. The sepals are creamy-white, ageing to pink or reddish, 5–6 mm (0.20–0.24 in) long and lack lobes but are deeply divided with spreading hairs, some of which are longer and more prominent than others. The petals are a similar colour to the sepals, more or less round and spreading, with a fringe of hairs around their edge and 2–4 mm (0.08–0.2 in) long. The staminodes are lance-shaped to egg-shaped, tapering towards the tip which is fringed with a few hairs. The style is straight, 5–5.5 mm (0.20–0.22 in) long, hairy around its upper part and has a cap-like stigma. Flowering time is mostly from September to November.

Some forms of this variety have flowers with a white style and yellow stigma when they open, while others have a red stigma with red hairs and a third type has a pale yellow stigma.

== Taxonomy and naming ==
The species, Verticordia huegelii was first formally described by Stephan Endlicher in 1837 and the description was published in Enumeratio plantarum quas in Novae Hollandiae ora austro-occidentali ad fluvium Cygnorum et in sinu Regis Georgii collegit Carolus Liber Baro de Hügel. In 1991, Alex George undertook a review of the genus and described four varieties of Verticordia huegelii, including this one.

== Distribution and habitat ==
This variety of V. huegelii grows in sand, clay and loam, often with granite, laterite or sandstone sometimes in areas that are wet in winter but also on hillsides, often with other species of verticordia. It occurs from near Geraldton south to near Dwellingup and to a few nearby inland areas in the Avon Wheatbelt, Geraldton Sandplains, Jarrah Forest and Swan Coastal Plain biogeographic regions.

== Conservation ==
Verticordia huegelii var. huegelii is classified as "not threatened" by the Western Australian Government Department of Parks and Wildlife.

== Use in horticulture ==
When grown in gardens, this variety is a single-stemmed, bushy shrub growing to a height of about 0.5 m (2 ft) with its variegated flowers remaining until December. It is usually propagated from cuttings, grows best in full sun and is usually hardy in a range of soils and climates as long as the soil is well-drained. The soil surface needs to be kept clear of organic matter to prevent problems with fungal infections.
