= Ewlyamartup, Western Australia =

Locality in the Shire of Katanning, Western Australia

Ewlyamartup
- other
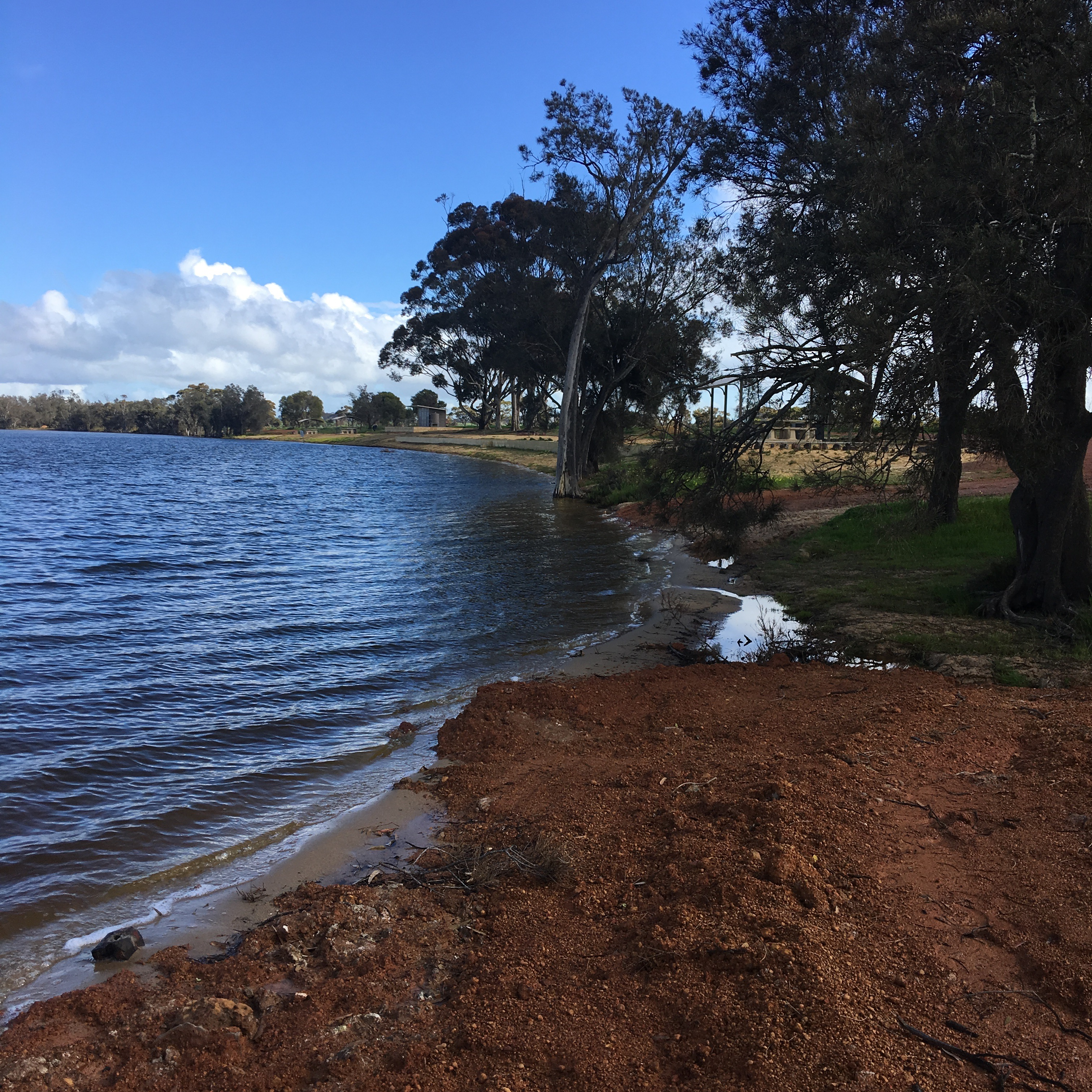
- Lake Ewlyamartup

- Coordinates: 33.69528°S 117.68580°E
- Country: Australia
- State: Western Australia
- LGA(s): Shire of Katanning
- Location: 262 km (163 mi) SE of Perth; 145 km (90 mi) N of Albany; 14 km (8.7 mi) SE of Katanning

Government
  - State electorate(s): Roe
  - Federal division(s): O'Connor

Area
  - Total: 146.4 km^{2} (56.5 sq mi)

Population
  - Total(s): 21 (SAL 2021)
- Postcode: 6317
Localities around Ewlyamartup
Katanning	Coblinine	Coblinine
Katanning	Ewlyamartup	Coyrecup
Murdong	Broomehill East	Broomehill East

Ewlyamartup is a rural locality of the Shire of Katanning in the Great Southern region of Western Australia. Katanning Airport, Lake Ewlyamartup and the southern end of the Coblinine Nature Reserve are located in Ewlyamartup, while Ewlyamartup Creek runs through it.

== History ==
Ewlyamartup is located on the traditional land of the Koreng people of the Noongar nation.

The name Ewlyamartup is of Koreng origin, meaning "come now to this place where there is a water hole associated with a leg".

Ewlyamartup was once a siding on the Katanning to Pingrup railway line. The siding opened in 1912 and closed for good in 1974. Additionally, the siding of Kibbelup, further west, was also in what is now the locality of Ewlyamartup and operated during the same time.

The historic Holland Track passes through Ewlyamartup, heading north from Broomehill before turning east after passing Lake Ewlyamartup, along the Katanning-Nyabing Road, on its way to Coolgardie.

Ewlyamartup school site is one of a number of sites of former schools in the shire, having been located on Lake Coyrecup Road. A second school, the Murdong and Woodlyn school, was also located within the current locality boundaries, on the corner of Murdong Pools and Belmont Road.

== Nature reserve ==
The Coblinine Nature Reserve, which spans most of the length of the Coblinine River, was gazetted on 4 September 1908, has a size of 41.67 square kilometres (16.09 sq mi), and is located within the Avon Wheatbelt bioregion. The reserve stretches from the Katanning-Nyabing Road in the south, in Ewlyamartup, to Dumbleyung Lake in the north, in the Shire of Dumbleyung.
