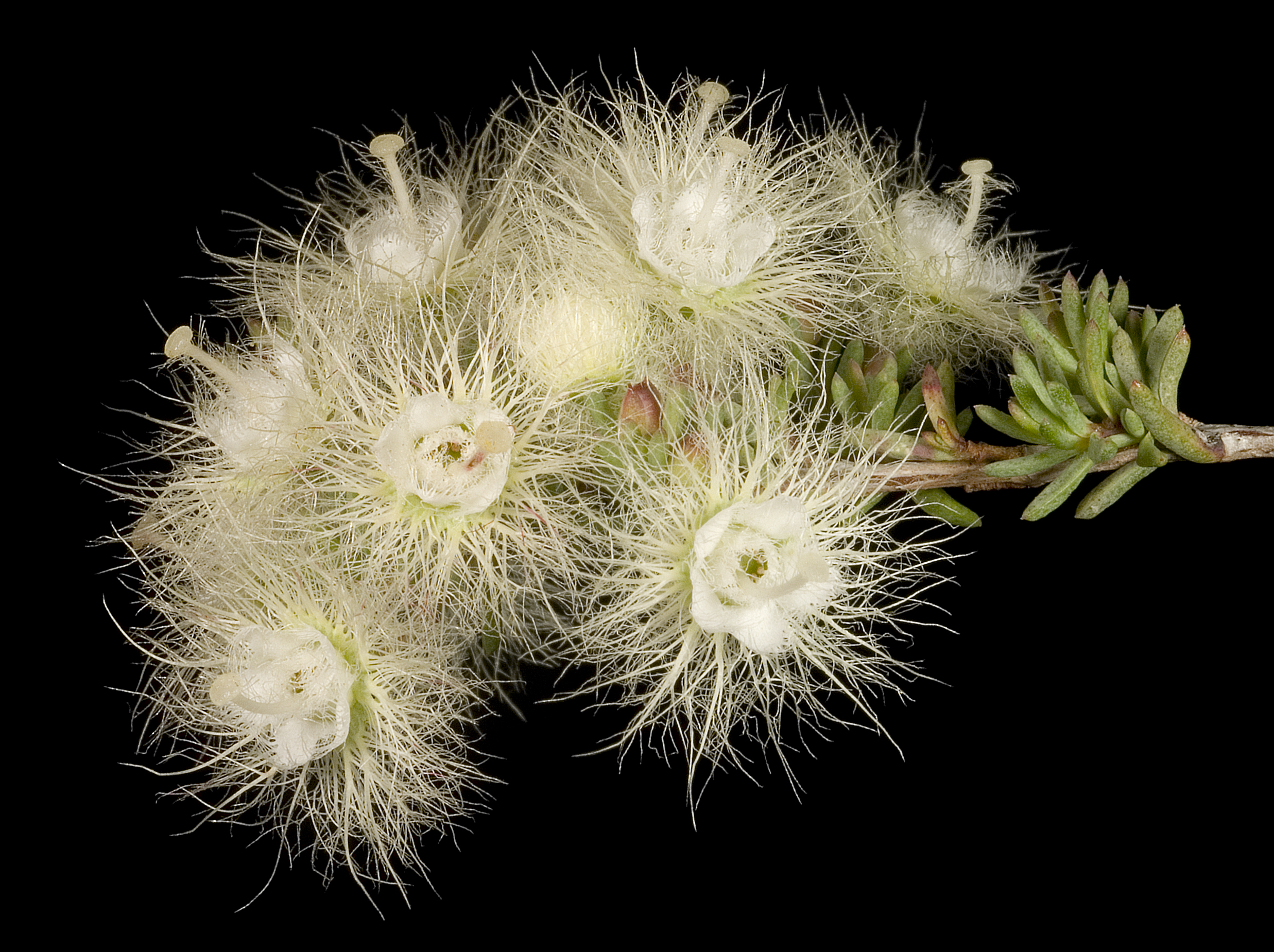

Scientific classification
- Kingdom: Plantae
- Clade: Tracheophytes
- Clade: Angiosperms
- Clade: Eudicots
- Clade: Rosids
- Order: Myrtales
- Family: Myrtaceae
- Genus: Verticordia
- Species: V. huegelii
- Variety: V. h. var. decumbens

Trinomial name
- Verticordia huegelii var. decumbens A.S.George

= Verticordia huegelii var. decumbens =

Variety of flowering plant

Verticordia huegelii var. decumbens, commonly known as variegated featherflower, is a flowering plant in the myrtle family, Myrtaceae and is endemic to the south-west of Western Australia. It is an almost prostrate shrub, with creamish-lemon coloured flowers turning pink then red as they age, giving the plant a variegated appearance. It is similar to Verticordia huegelii var. huegelii but has a lignotuber and a lower growth habit.

== Description ==
Verticordia huegelii var. decumbens is a shrub which usually grows to 5–20 cm (2–8 in) high, 30–50 cm (10–20 in) wide, has a fire-tolerant lignotuber and sometimes a suckering habit. Its leaves are linear to club-shaped, semi-circular in cross-section, 3–6 mm (0.1–0.2 in) long and about 0.5 mm (0.02 in) thick.

The flowers are unscented and arranged in rounded groups near the ends of the branches, each flower on a stalk 4–11 mm (0.2–0.4 in) long. The floral cup is top-shaped, about 2 mm (0.08 in) long, smooth and partly hairy. The sepals are creamy-lemon coloured when they open, ageing to pink then red, 7–8 mm (0.28–0.31 in) long and lack lobes but are deeply divided with spreading hairs. The petals are a similar colour to the sepals, more or less round and spreading, about 2 mm (0.08 in) long and wide with a fringe of hairs around their edge. The staminodes are lance-shaped to egg-shaped, tapering towards the tip which is fringed with hairs. The style is straight, 5–5.5 mm (0.20–0.22 in) long, has spreading hairs around its upper part and has a cap-like stigma. Flowering time is mostly from September to November.

Of the four varieties of V. huegelii, var. decumbens is closest to var. huegelii but differs in its low growth form, creamy-lemon flowers and spreading hairs on the style.

== Taxonomy and naming ==
The species, Verticordia huegelii was first formally described by Stephan Endlicher in 1837 and the description was published in Enumeratio plantarum quas in Novae Hollandiae ora austro-occidentali ad fluvium Cygnorum et in sinu Regis Georgii collegit Carolus Liber Baro de Hügel. In 1991, Alex George undertook a review of the genus and described four varieties of Verticordia huegelii, including this one. The type specimen was collected near Kelmscott in 1985. The epithet (decumbens) is a reference to the decumbent habit of this variety.

== Distribution and habitat ==
This variety of V. huegelii grows in sandy clay, gravel derived from granite in shrubland. It is found in isolated populations on the Darling Range between Mundaring and Williams and in areas north of Badgingarra in the Avon Wheatbelt, Geraldton Sandplains and Jarrah Forest biogeographic regions.

== Conservation ==
Verticordia huegelii var. decumbens is classified as "not threatened" by the Western Australian Government Department of Parks and Wildlife.

== Use in horticulture ==
This variety is easy to propagate from cuttings or from seed and is hardy and moderately frost tolerant when grown in well-drained but not sandy soils.
