= Verticordia sect. Pilocosta =

Scientific classification
- Kingdom: Plantae
- Clade: Tracheophytes
- Clade: Angiosperms
- Clade: Eudicots
- Clade: Rosids
- Order: Myrtales
- Family: Myrtaceae
- Genus: Verticordia
- Subgenus: Verticordia subg. Verticordia
- Section: Verticordia sect. Pilocosta; A.S.George

Species
- 3 species: see text.

Group of flowering plants

Verticordia sect. Pilocosta is one of eleven sections in the subgenus Verticordia. It includes three species of plants in the genus Verticordia. Plants in this section are mostly small, bushy shrubs greyish, needle-like leaves and hairy, rather than feathery flowers. Plants in this section have a flower cup with 10 hairy ribs, fringed sepals and a style which is hairy and has a distinct cap. When Alex George reviewed the genus in 1991 he formally described this section, publishing the description in the journal Nuytsia. The name Pilocosta is from the Latin words pilus meaning "hair" and costa meaning "rib" referring to the hairy ribs on the floral cup.

The type species for this section is Verticordia huegelii and the other two species are V. brachypoda and V. multiflora.
