= Verticordia huegelii var. stylosa =

Scientific classification
- Kingdom: Plantae
- Clade: Tracheophytes
- Clade: Angiosperms
- Clade: Eudicots
- Clade: Rosids
- Order: Myrtales
- Family: Myrtaceae
- Genus: Verticordia
- Species: V. huegelii
- Variety: V. h. var. stylosa

Trinomial name
- Verticordia huegelii var. stylosa (Turcz.)A.S.George

Variety of flowering plant

Verticordia huegelii var. stylosa, commonly known as variegated featherflower, is a flowering plant in the myrtle family, Myrtaceae and is endemic to the south-west of Western Australia. It is a single-stemmed shrub with its growth form depending on its surroundings. It is similar to other varieties of the species but differs in its flower colour and the form of the style and staminodes.

== Description ==
Verticordia huegelii var. stylosa is a shrub which usually grows to 10–60 cm (4–20 in) high. In open situations it is bushy and spreads to 60 cm (20 in) but is spindly when growing close to other small shrubs. Its leaves are linear to club-shaped, semi-circular in cross-section, 3–6 mm (0.1–0.2 in) long and about 0.5 mm (0.02 in) thick.

The flowers are unscented and arranged in rounded groups near the ends of the branches, each flower on a stalk 4–11 mm (0.2–0.4 in) long. The floral cup is top-shaped, about 2 mm (0.08 in) long, smooth and partly hairy. The sepals are pale creamy-green to lemon coloured when they open, ageing to orange and finally, rusty-red. They are 7–8 mm (0.28–0.31 in) long and lack lobes but are deeply divided with spreading hairs. The petals are a similar colour to the sepals, more or less round and spreading, about 2 mm (0.08 in) long and wide with a fringe of hairs around their edge. The staminodes are lance-shaped to egg-shaped, tapering towards the tip which is fringed with a few hairs. The style is straight, 5–5.5 mm (0.20–0.22 in) long, has a few hairs around its upper part and has a cap-like stigma. The sepals, petals and style are slightly smaller, the staminodes slightly broader and the style slightly shorter than those of var. huegelii. Flowering time is mostly from September to December.

== Taxonomy and naming ==
The species, Verticordia stylosa was first formally described in 1847 by Nikolai Turczaninow in Bulletin de la Société Impériale des Naturalistes de Moscou. In 1991, Alex George undertook a review of the genus and described this as one of the four varieties of Verticordia huegelii. The epithet (stylosa) is a reference to the prominent style of the species, now variety.

== Distribution and habitat ==
This variety of V. huegelii grows in sandy clay-loam, often with lateritic gravel in areas that are wet in winter and usually with other species of verticordia. It is found in scattered locations in areas between Dandaragan, Wongan Hills and Kalgan in the Avon Wheatbelt, Geraldton Sandplains, Jarrah Forest, Mallee and Swan Coastal Plain biogeographic regions.

== Conservation ==
Verticordia huegelii var. stylosa is classified as "not threatened" by the Western Australian Government Department of Parks and Wildlife.

== Use in horticulture ==
Although not often cultivated, this variety is described as "an attractive, bushy shrub". It is usually propagated from cuttings although these are sometimes difficult to grow on. It appears to be frost hardy and tolerates the removal of a few stems for floral arrangements.
