= South Glencoe, Western Australia =

Locality in the Shire of Katanning, Western Australia

South Glencoe
- Interactive map of South Glencoe
- Coordinates: 33.53083°S 117.66190°E
- Country: Australia
- State: Western Australia
- LGA: Shire of Katanning
- Location: 240 km (150 mi) SE of Perth; 168 km (104 mi) N of Albany; 19 km (12 mi) NE of Katanning

Government
  - State electorate: Roe
  - Federal division: O'Connor

Area
  - Total: 91.8 km^{2} (35.4 sq mi)

Population
  - Total: 10 (SAL 2021)
- Postcode: 6317
Localities around South Glencoe
Glencoe	Bullock Hills	Bullock Hills
Glencoe	South Glencoe	Coblinine
Moojebing	Coblinine	Coblinine

South Glencoe is a rural locality in the Shire of Katanning, situated in the Great Southern region of Western Australia. The Johns Well Nature Reserve is located within South Glencoe, along with a small part of the unnamed WA24282 Nature Reserve.

South Glencoe lies on the traditional land of the Koreng people of the Noongar nation.

The name "Glencoe" originates from Glencoe House, a property in the neighbouring locality of Glencoe, which gave its name to the area and several of buildings within it.

== Nature reserves ==
The Johns Well Nature Reserve was gazetted on 23 November 1956, covers an area of 3.85 square kilometres (1.49 mi^{2}), and is located within the Avon Wheatbelt bioregion.

The unnamed WA24282 Nature Reserve, with its western end extending into South Glencoe, was gazetted on 23 September 1955, has an area of 3.09 square kilometres (1.19 mi^{2}), and is also located within the Avon Wheatbelt bioregion.
