= Verticordia huegelii var. tridens =

Scientific classification
- Kingdom: Plantae
- Clade: Tracheophytes
- Clade: Angiosperms
- Clade: Eudicots
- Clade: Rosids
- Order: Myrtales
- Family: Myrtaceae
- Genus: Verticordia
- Species: V. huegelii
- Variety: V. h. var. tridens

Trinomial name
- Verticordia huegelii var. tridens A.S.George

Variety of flowering plant

Verticordia huegelii var. tridens, commonly known as variegated featherflower, is a flowering plant in the myrtle family, Myrtaceae and is endemic to the south-west of Western Australia. It is a slender, open, sometimes straggly shrub with bright yellow flowers which age to red and then brown and differently-shaped staminodes from the other varieties of the species.

== Description ==
Verticordia huegelii var. tridens is a shrub which grows to 20–60 cm (8–20 in) high and 10–30 cm (4–10 in). Its leaves are linear to club-shaped, semi-circular in cross-section, 3–6 mm (0.1–0.2 in) long and about 0.5 mm (0.02 in) thick.

The flowers are faintly scented and arranged in rounded groups near the ends of the branches, each flower on a stalk 4–11 mm (0.2–0.4 in) long. The floral cup is top-shaped, about 2 mm (0.08 in) long, smooth and partly hairy. The sepals are a bright citrus-yellow when they open, ageing to red and finally brown. They are 7–8 mm (0.28–0.31 in) long and lack lobes but are deeply divided with spreading hairs. The petals are a similar colour to the sepals, more or less round and spreading, about 2 mm (0.08 in) long and wide with a fringe of hairs around their edge. The staminodes are linear, tapering to a point with one or two teeth on each side. The style is straight, 5–5.5 mm (0.20–0.22 in) long, has a few yellow, reddish or purple hairs around its upper part and has a cap-like stigma. Flowering time is mostly from September to November.

== Taxonomy and naming ==
The species, Verticordia huegelii was first formally described by Stephan Endlicher in 1837 and the description was published in Enumeratio plantarum quas in Novae Hollandiae ora austro-occidentali ad fluvium Cygnorum et in sinu Regis Georgii collegit Carolus Liber Baro de Hügel. In 1991, Alex George undertook a review of the genus and described four varieties of Verticordia huegelii, including this one. The epithet (tridens) is a Latin word meaning "having three teeth".

== Distribution and habitat ==
This variety of V. huegelii grows in lateritic or granitic sand or loam, often in areas that are wet in winter and often with other species of verticordia in heath, shrubland or woodland. It is found in scattered, small populations from near Wongan Hills to the Porongurup National Park in the Avon Wheatbelt, Esperance Plains, Jarrah Forest and Swan Coastal Plain biogeographic regions.

== Conservation ==
Verticordia huegelii var. stylosa is classified as "Priority Three" by the Western Australian Government Department of Parks and Wildlife meaning that it is poorly known and known from only a few locations but is not under imminent threat.

== Use in horticulture ==
This variety has rarely been cultivated and its requirements are not well understood. It is easily propagated from cuttings but these have proven difficult to establish in the garden.
