= Coblinine, Western Australia =

Locality in the Shire of Katanning, Western Australia

Coblinine
- Interactive map of Coblinine
- Coordinates: 33.59750°S 117.70330°E
- Country: Australia
- State: Western Australia
- LGA: Shire of Katanning
- Location: 252 km (157 mi) SE of Perth; 156 km (97 mi) N of Albany; 15 km (9.3 mi) NE of Katanning

Government
  - State electorate: Roe
  - Federal division: O'Connor

Area
  - Total: 214.5 km^{2} (82.8 sq mi)

Population
  - Total: 49 (SAL 2021)
- Postcode: 6317
Localities around Coblinine
South Glencoe	Bullock Hills	Datatine
Moojebing	Coblinine	Badgebup
Katanning	Ewlyamartup	Coyrecup

Coblinine is a rural locality of the Shire of Katanning in the Great Southern region of Western Australia. The Coblinine Nature Reserve, situated along the Coblinine River, is located in Coblinine.

== History ==
Coblinine is located on the traditional land of the Koreng people of the Noongar nation.

The name Coblinine is of Koreng origin, meaning "all of the stomach intestines and navel, river-like, are here sitting".

== Nature reserves ==
The Coblinine Nature Reserve, which spans most of the length of the Coblinine River, was gazetted on 4 September 1908, has a size of 41.67 square kilometres (16.09 mi^{2}), and is located within the Avon Wheatbelt bioregion. The reserve stretches from the Katanning-Nyabing Road in the south, in Ewlyamartup, to Dumbleyung Lake in the north, in the Shire of Dumbleyung.

Two unnamed nature reserves are also located within Coblinine, both adjacent to the Coblinine Nature Reserve, the WA27481 and WA24282 Nature Reserves. The former is fully within the locality, the other one only partially. WA27481 was gazetted on 7 May 1965, with a size of 1.07 square kilometres (0.41 mi^{2}) and WA24282 was gazetted on 23 September 1955, with a size of 3.09 square kilometres (1.19 mi^{2}). Both are also in the Avon Wheatbelt bioregion.
