= Banksia porrecta =

Conservation status
- Priority Four — Rare Taxa (DEC)

Scientific classification
- Kingdom: Plantae
- Clade: Tracheophytes
- Clade: Angiosperms
- Clade: Eudicots
- Order: Proteales
- Family: Proteaceae
- Genus: Banksia
- Subgenus: Banksia subg. Banksia
- Series: Banksia ser. Dryandra
- Species: B. porrecta

Binomial name
- Banksia porrecta (A.S.George) A.R.Mast & K.R.Thiele

Species of shrub endemic to Western Australia

Banksia porrecta is a species of prostrate shrub that is endemic to the south-west of Western Australia. It has hairy, underground stems, pinnatipartite leaves with up to forty narrow triangular lobes on each side, yellow flowers in heads of between twenty and thirty, and one or two egg-shaped follicles in each head.

== Description ==
Banksia porrecta is a prostrate shrub with hairy underground stems. The leaves are pinnatipartite, 150–300 mm (5.9–11.8 in) long and 20–30 mm (0.79–1.18 in) wide on a petiole 20–35 mm (0.79–1.38 in) long. The petiole is hairy and there are between thirty and forty narrow triangular lobes up to 16 mm (0.63 in) long on each side of the leaves. Between twenty and thirty yellow flowers are borne in heads with egg-shaped to oblong involucral bracts up to 25 mm (0.98 in) long at the base of each head. The perianth is 37–40 mm (1.5–1.6 in) long and the pistil 37–40 mm (1.5–1.6 in) long. Flowering occurs from July to August, and one or two egg-shaped follicles 11–15 mm (0.43–0.59 in) long form in each head.

== Taxonomy and naming ==
This species was first formally described in 1996 by Alex George who gave it the name Dryandra porrecta and published the description in the journal Nuytsia from specimens he collected near Woodanilling in 1986. The specific epithet (porrecta) is from the Latin porrectus, in turn from porrigo meaning "to spread out" or "to extend", referring to the prostrate habit.

In 2007, Austin Mast and Kevin Thiele transferred all the dryandras to the genus Banksia and this species became Banksia porrecta.

== Distribution and habitat ==
Banksia porrecta grows in low kwongan, often with sedges and mallee eucalypts, in scattered locations between Woodanilling and Tenterden.

== Ecology ==
An assessment of the potential impact of climate change on this species found that its range is likely to contract by between 50% and 80% by 2080, depending on the severity of the change.

== Conservation status ==
Banksia porrecta is classified as "Priority Four" by the Government of Western Australia Department of Parks and Wildlife, meaning that is rare or near threatened.
