= Holland Track =

Track between Broomehill and Coolgardie in Western Australia

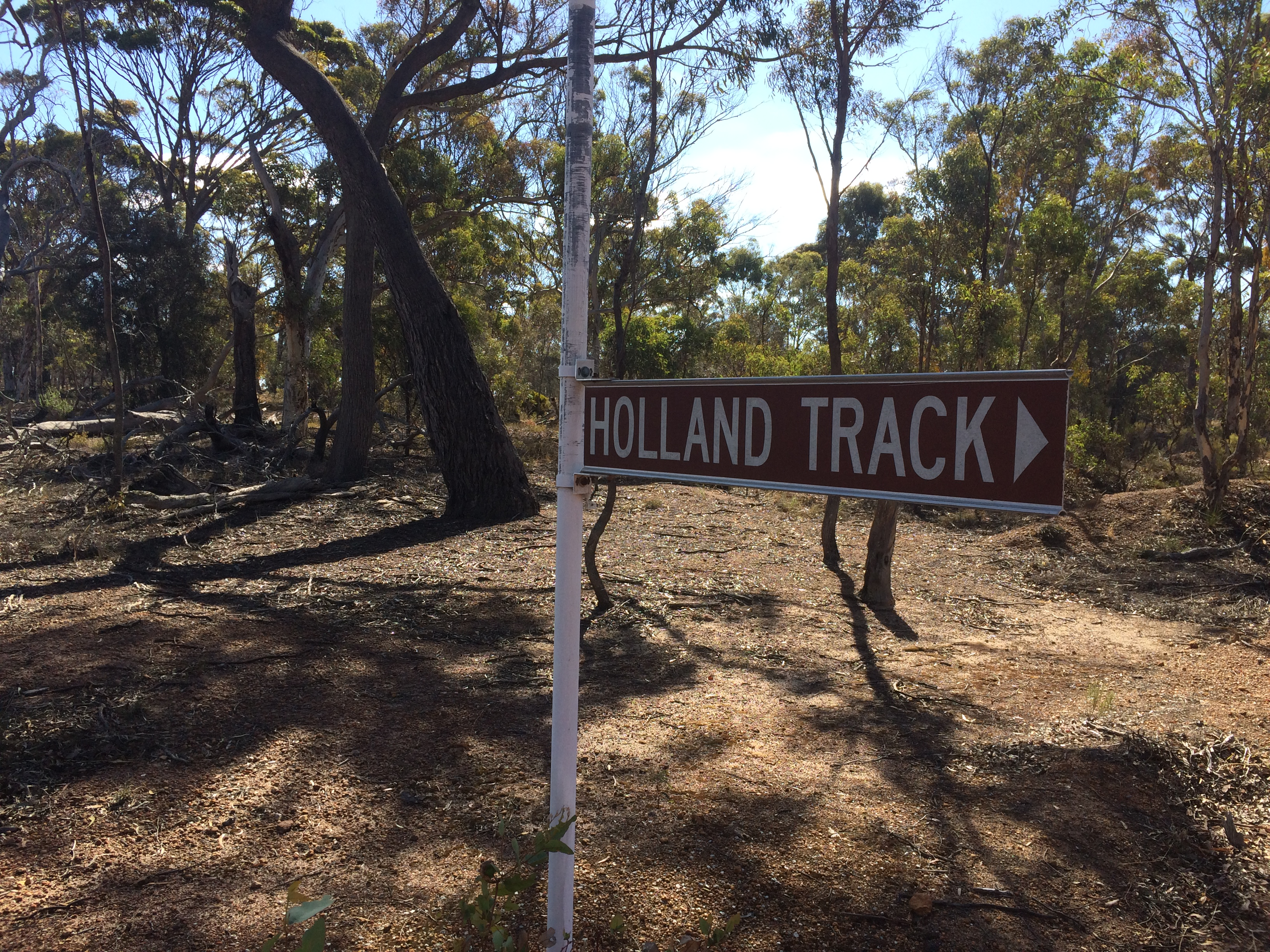
Sign marking Holland Track near Badgebup

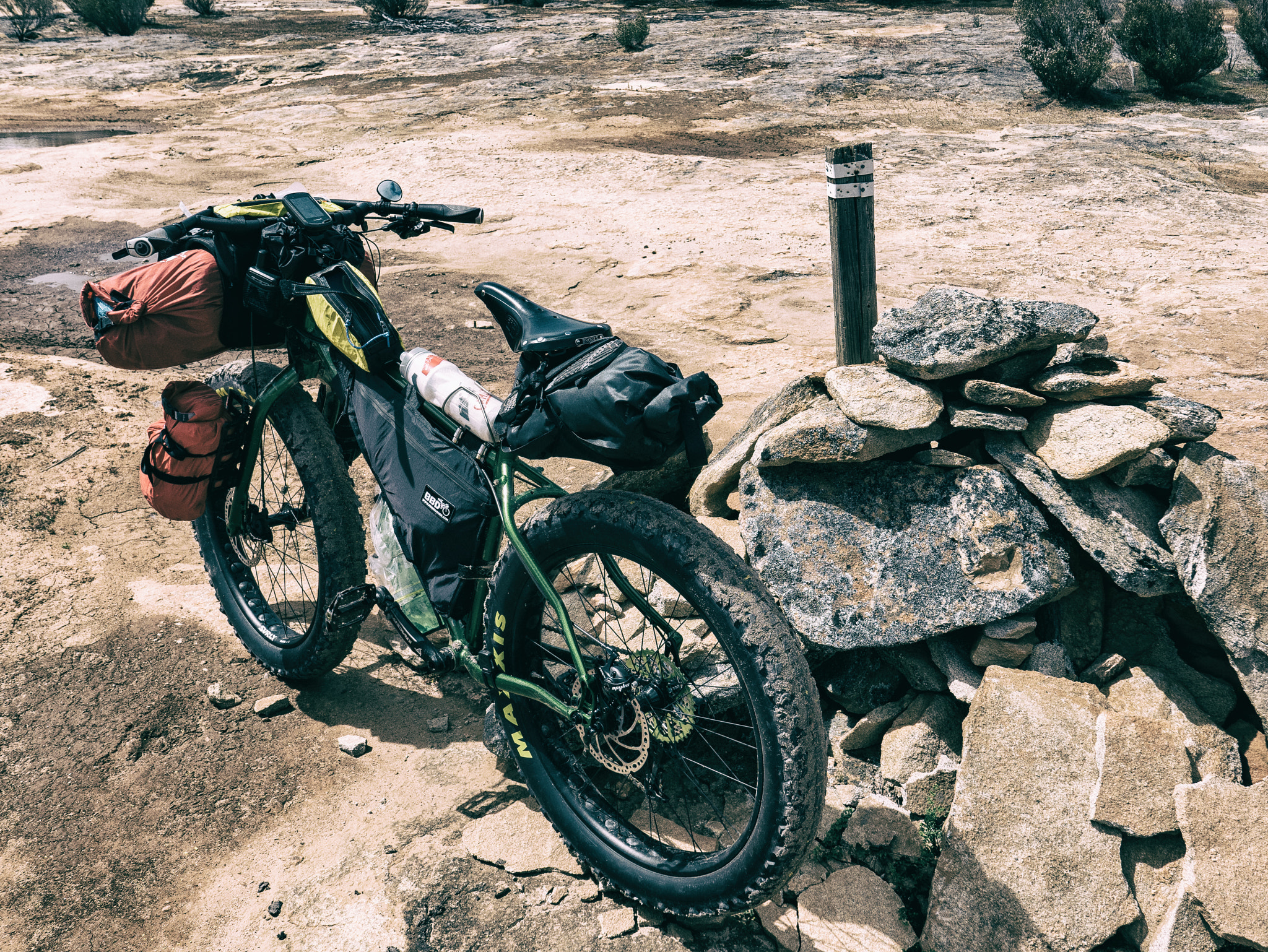
Holland Track Granite Rock Outcrop

The Holland Track, also known as the John Holland Way, is a bush track between Broomehill and Coolgardie in Western Australia.

With a total length of around 700 kilometres (435 mi), the track passes through parts of the Great Southern, Wheatbelt and Goldfields regions including the biologically diverse Great Western Woodlands, which is the largest intact area of Mediterranean climate woodland left in the world.

The track was pioneered by John Holland in 1893 as a short cut through to the Goldfields.

== See also ==
- Gibb River Road
