= Shire of Katanning =

Coordinates: 33°41′13″S 117°34′30″E

- Local government area
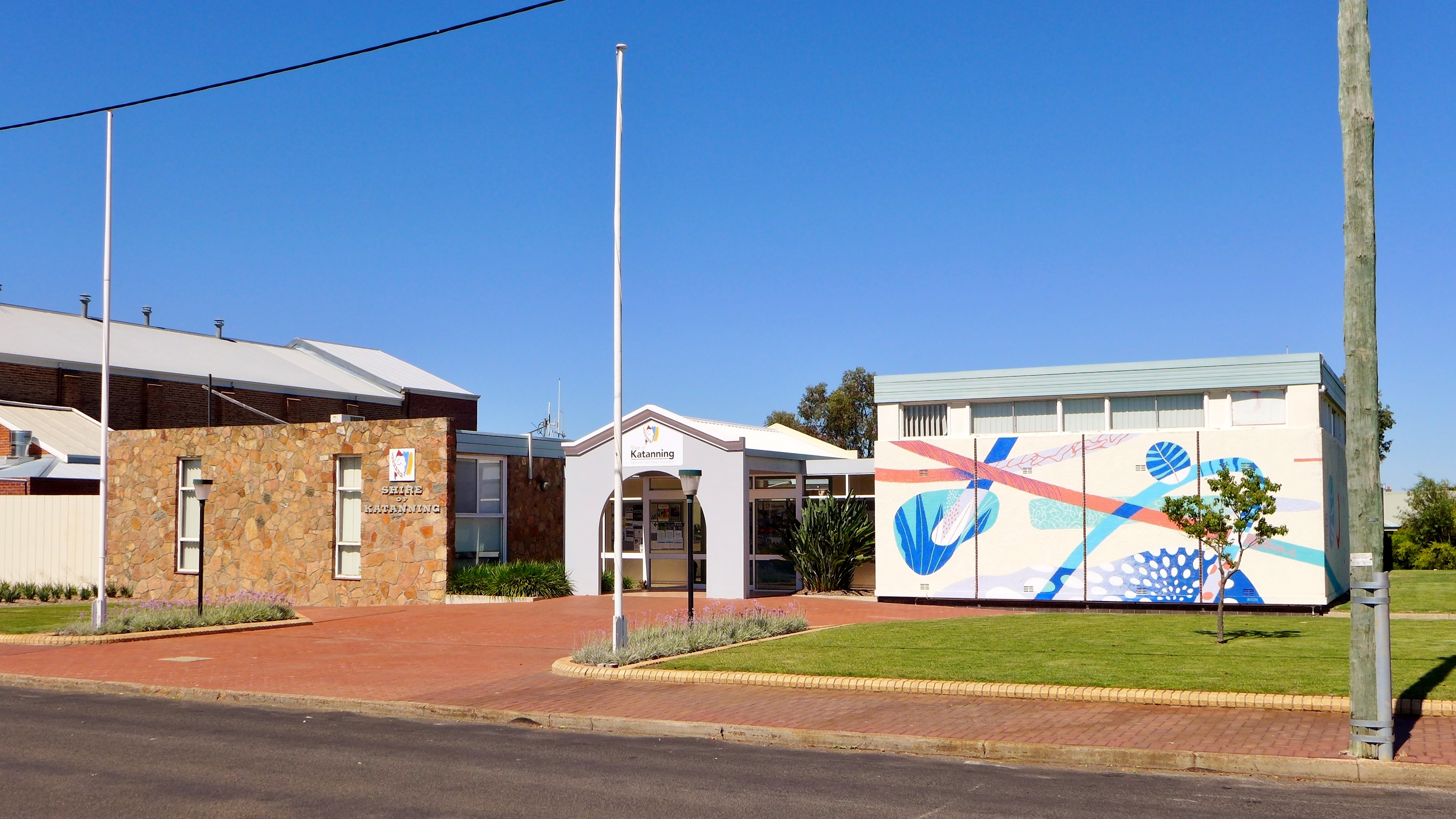
- Katanning shire offices, 2018

- Interactive map of Shire of Katanning
- Country: Australia
- State: Western Australia
- Region: Great Southern
- Established: 1892
- Council seat: Katanning

Government
  - President: Kristy D'Aprile
  - State electorate: Roe
  - Federal division: O'Connor

Area
  - Total: 1,518.5 km^{2} (586.3 sq mi)

Population
  - Total: 4,057 (LGA 2021)
- Website: Shire of Katanning
LGAs around Shire of Katanning
Woodanilling	Dumbleyung	Kent
Kojonup	Shire of Katanning	Kent
Kojonup	Broomehill-Tambellup	Gnowangerup

The Shire of Katanning is a local government area in the Great Southern region of Western Australia, about 170 kilometres (106 mi) north of Albany and about 290 kilometres (180 mi) southeast of the state capital, Perth. The Shire covers an area of 1,518 square kilometres (586 sq mi), and its seat of government is the town of Katanning.

== History ==
The Katanning Road District was gazetted on 18 May 1892. On 1 July 1961, it became a Shire following the passage of the Local Government Act 1960, which reformed all remaining road districts into shires.

== Indigenous people ==
The larger eastern part of the shire, up to Katanning itself, is located on the traditional land of the Koreng people. The smaller western part, west of Katanning, is located on the traditional land of the Kaneang people, with both being of the Noongar nation.

== Towns and localities ==
The towns and localities of the Shire of Katanning with population and size figures based on the most recent Australian census:

Locality	Population	Area	Map
Badgebup	37 (SAL 2016)	207.6 km^{2} (80.2 sq mi)	
Carrolup	49 (SAL 2016)	167.1 km^{2} (64.5 sq mi)	
Coblinine	49 (SAL 2021)	214.5 km^{2} (82.8 sq mi)	
Coyrecup	31 (SAL 2021)	220.1 km^{2} (85.0 sq mi)	
Ewlyamartup	21 (SAL 2021)	146.4 km^{2} (56.5 sq mi)	
Katanning	3,637 (SAL 2021)	136.3 km^{2} (52.6 sq mi)	
Marracoonda	17 (SAL 2021)	57.8 km^{2} (22.3 sq mi)	
Moojebing	63 (SAL 2021)	102.8 km^{2} (39.7 sq mi)	
Murdong	24 (SAL 2021)	78 km^{2} (30 sq mi)	
Pinwernying	97 (SAL 2021)	5.4 km^{2} (2.1 sq mi)	
South Datatine	20 (SAL 2016)	89.7 km^{2} (34.6 sq mi)	
South Glencoe	10 (SAL 2021)	91.8 km^{2} (35.4 sq mi)	

== Notable councillors ==
- Frederick Piesse, Katanning Road Board member 1889–1896; later a state MP
- Wesley Maley, Katanning Road Board chairman 1898; later a state MP
- Arnold Piesse, Katanning Road Board chairman for 11 years; later a state MP
- Alec Thomson, Katanning Road Board member 1911–1915, chairman 1913; later a state MP

== Heritage-listed places ==
As of 2024, 122 places are heritage-listed in the Shire of Katanning, of which 19 are on the State Register of Heritage Places.
