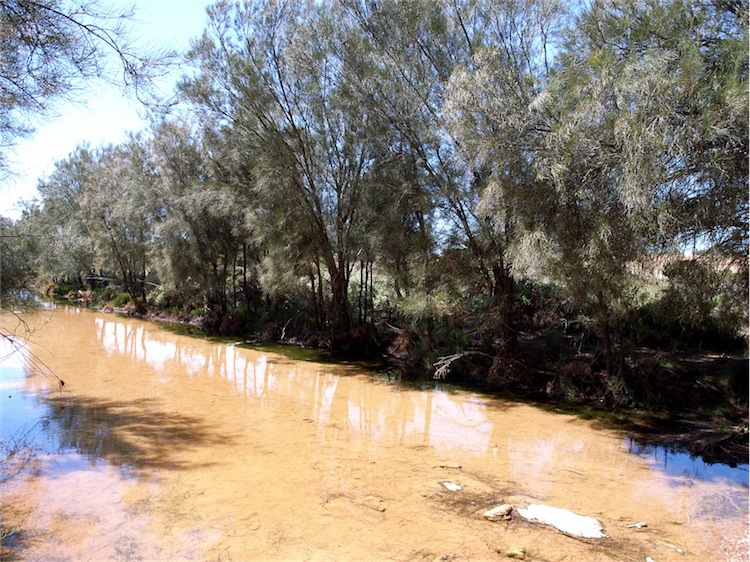
- Near Paynes Find

Scientific classification
- Kingdom: Plantae
- Clade: Tracheophytes
- Clade: Angiosperms
- Clade: Eudicots
- Clade: Rosids
- Order: Fagales
- Family: Casuarinaceae
- Genus: Casuarina
- Species: C. obesa

Binomial name
- Casuarina obesa Miq.

= Casuarina obesa =

Species of tree

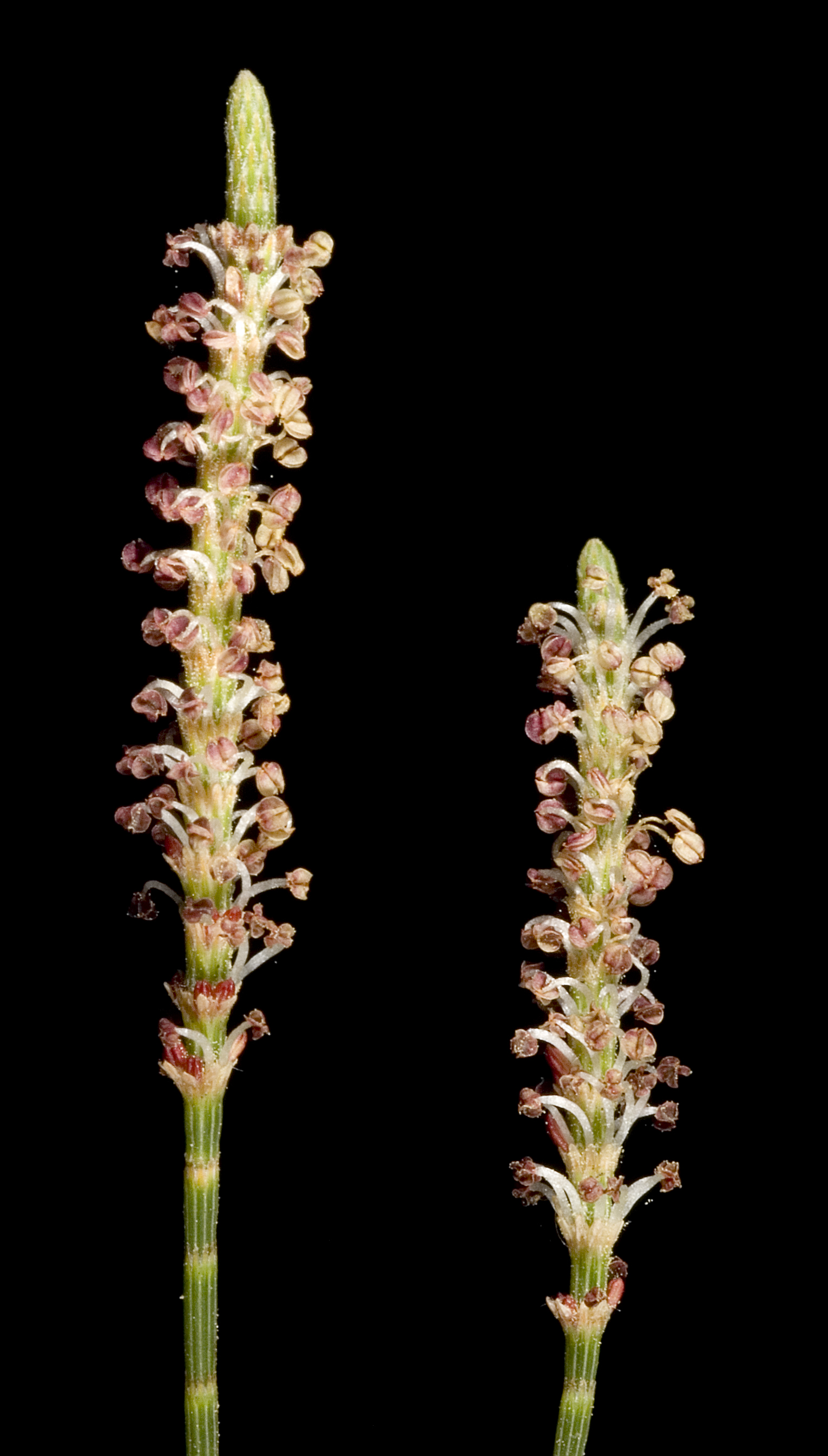
Male spikes

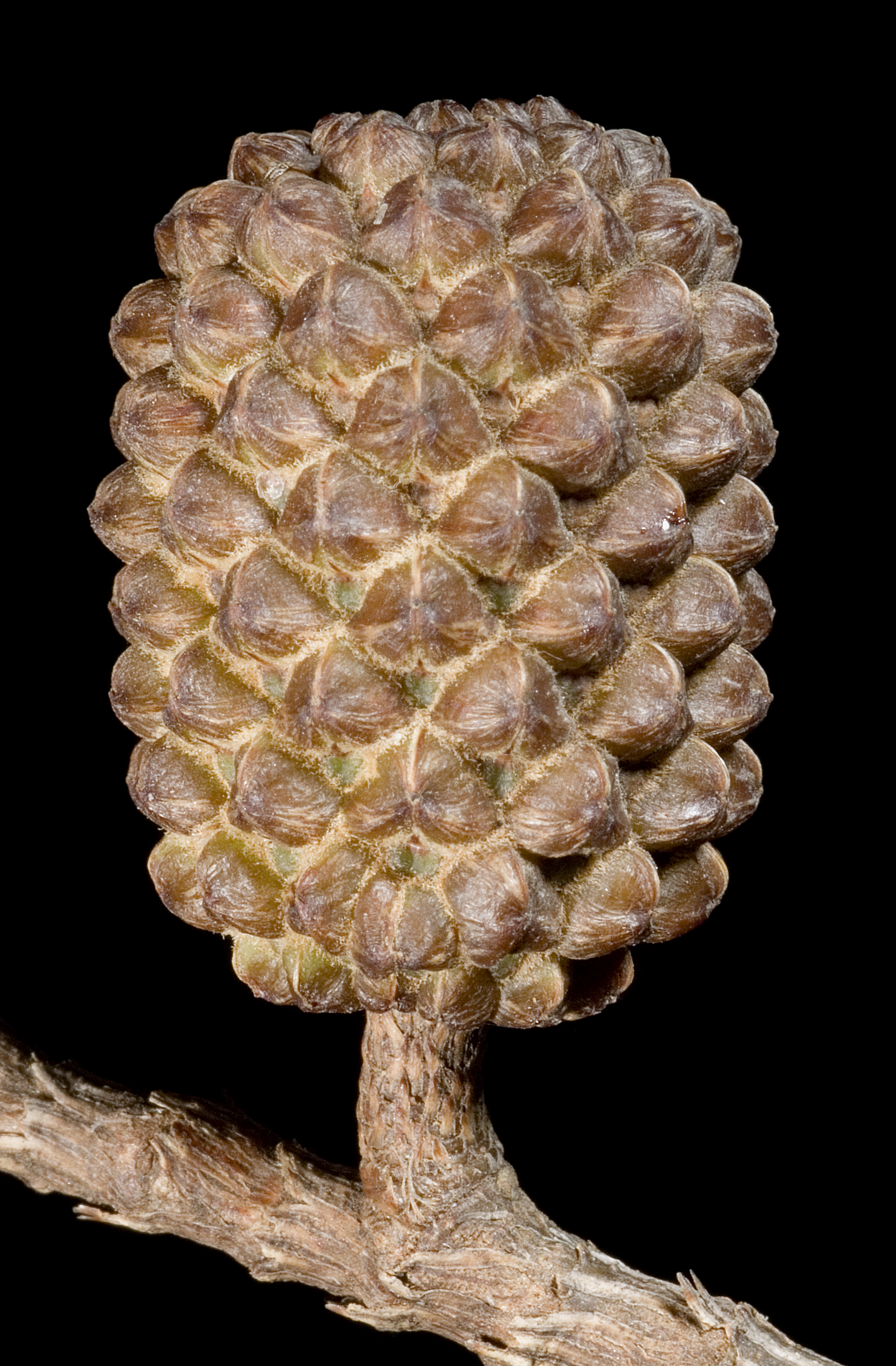
Mature cone

Casuarina obesa, commonly known as swamp she-oak, swamp oak or western swamp oak, or as goolee, kweela, kwerl and quilinock by the Noongar peoples, is a species of flowering plant in the family Casuarinaceae and is endemic to southern continental Australia. It is a dioecious small tree or shrub that forms root suckers, and has drooping or spreading branchlets, the leaves reduced to scales in whorls of 12 to 16, the fruit 10–20 mm (0.39–0.79 in) long containing winged seeds (samaras) 3–5 mm (0.12–0.20 in) long.

== Description ==
Casuarina obesa is a dioecious shrub or small tree that typically grows to a height of 3–15 m (9.8–49.2 ft) and has corky, deeply fissured bark. The branchlets are drooping or spreading to erect, up to 300 mm (12 in) long, the leaves reduced to scale-like teeth 0.3–1 mm (0.012–0.039 in) long, arranged in whorls of 12 to 16 around the branchlets and erect on new shoots. The sections of branchlet between the leaf whorls (the "articles") are 8–14 mm (0.31–0.55 in) long and 0.9–1.4 mm (0.035–0.055 in) wide. The flowers on male trees are arranged in whorls of 7 to 10 per centimetre (per 0.39 in.), the spikes 15–60 mm (0.59–2.36 in) long, the anthers 0.6–1.2 mm (0.024–0.047 in) long. The female cones are sessile or on a peduncle up to 10 mm (0.39 in) long. Mature cones are cylindrical, 10–20 mm (0.39–0.79 in) long and 10–15 mm (0.39–0.59 in) in diameter, the samaras 3–5 mm (0.12–0.20 in) long.

This species is the western and inland variant of C. glauca, but differs in having erect teeth on new shoots. It also hybridises with C. pauper in Western Australia.

== Taxonomy ==
Casuarina obesa was first formally described in 1845 by Friedrich Miquel in Lehmann's Plantae Preissianae. The specific epithet, (obesa) means "fat", "stout" or "plump".

== Distribution and habitat ==
Swamp she-oak grows in moist, often brackish or saline places along watercourses and near salt lakes. It is widespread and common in the south-west of Western Australia, with a much more restricted occurrence in New South Wales, Victoria and South Australia.

== Conservation status ==
Casuarina obesa is listed as "endangered" under the New South Wales Government Biodiversity Conservation Act 2016 and as "critically endangered" under the Victorian Government Flora and Fauna Guarantee Act 1988. The main threats to the species include grazing by livestock and rabbits, weed invasion and land clearing.

== Usage ==
This species is widely planted for agroforestry, particularly in salt-affected areas, and as a street tree.
