= Badgebup, Western Australia =

Badgebup
- Town
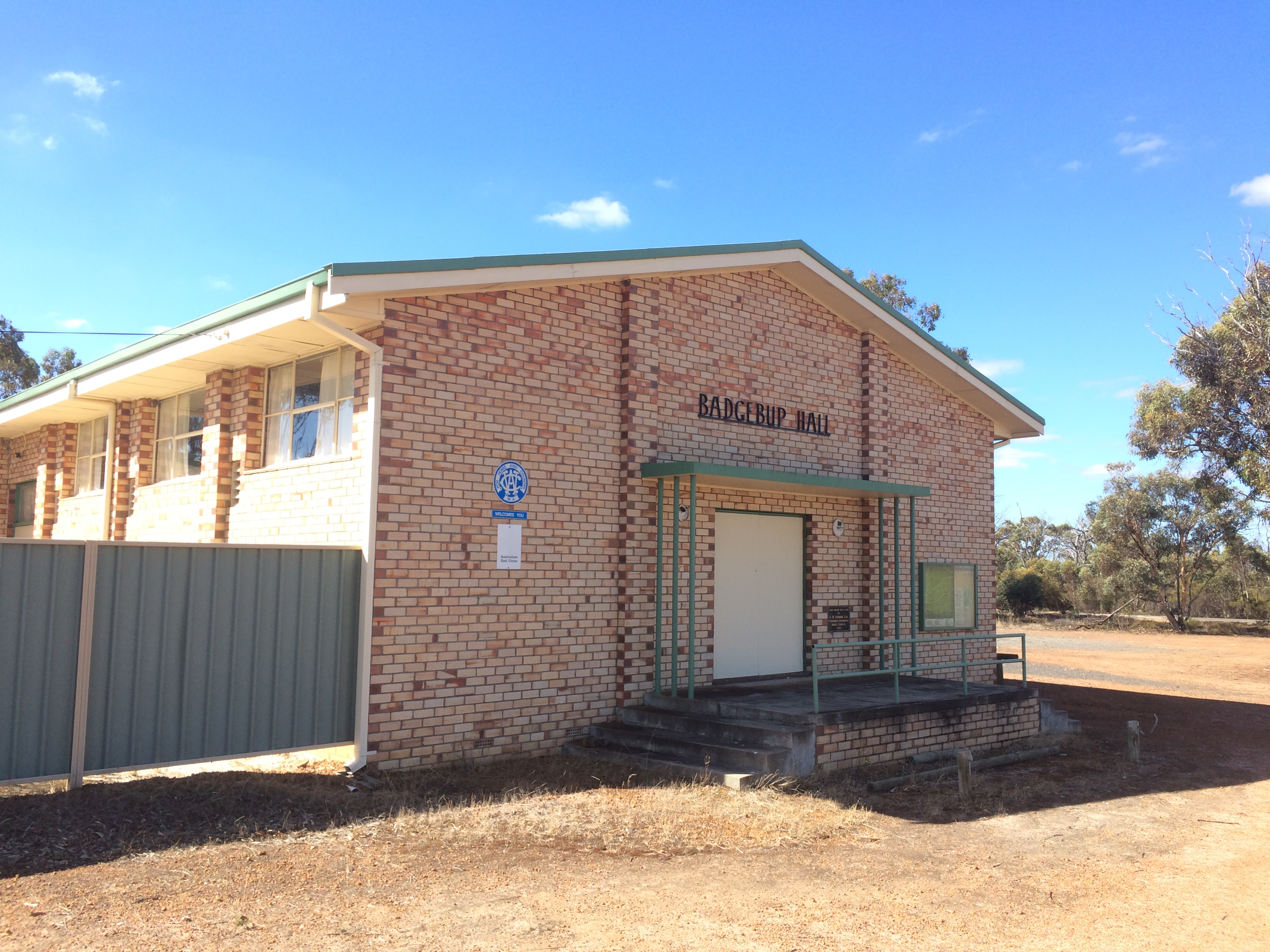
- Badgebup Hall 2018

- Interactive map of Badgebup
- Coordinates: 33.631°S 117.899°E
- Country: Australia
- State: Western Australia
- LGA: Shire of Katanning
- Location: 329 km (204 mi) south east of Perth; 32 km (20 mi) east of Katanning; 39 km (24 mi) south of Dumbleyung
- Established: 1923

Government
  - State electorate: Roe
  - Federal division: O'Connor

Area
  - Total: 207.6 km^{2} (80.2 sq mi)
- Elevation: 306 m (1,004 ft)

Population
  - Total: 37 (SAL 2016)
- Postcode: 6317

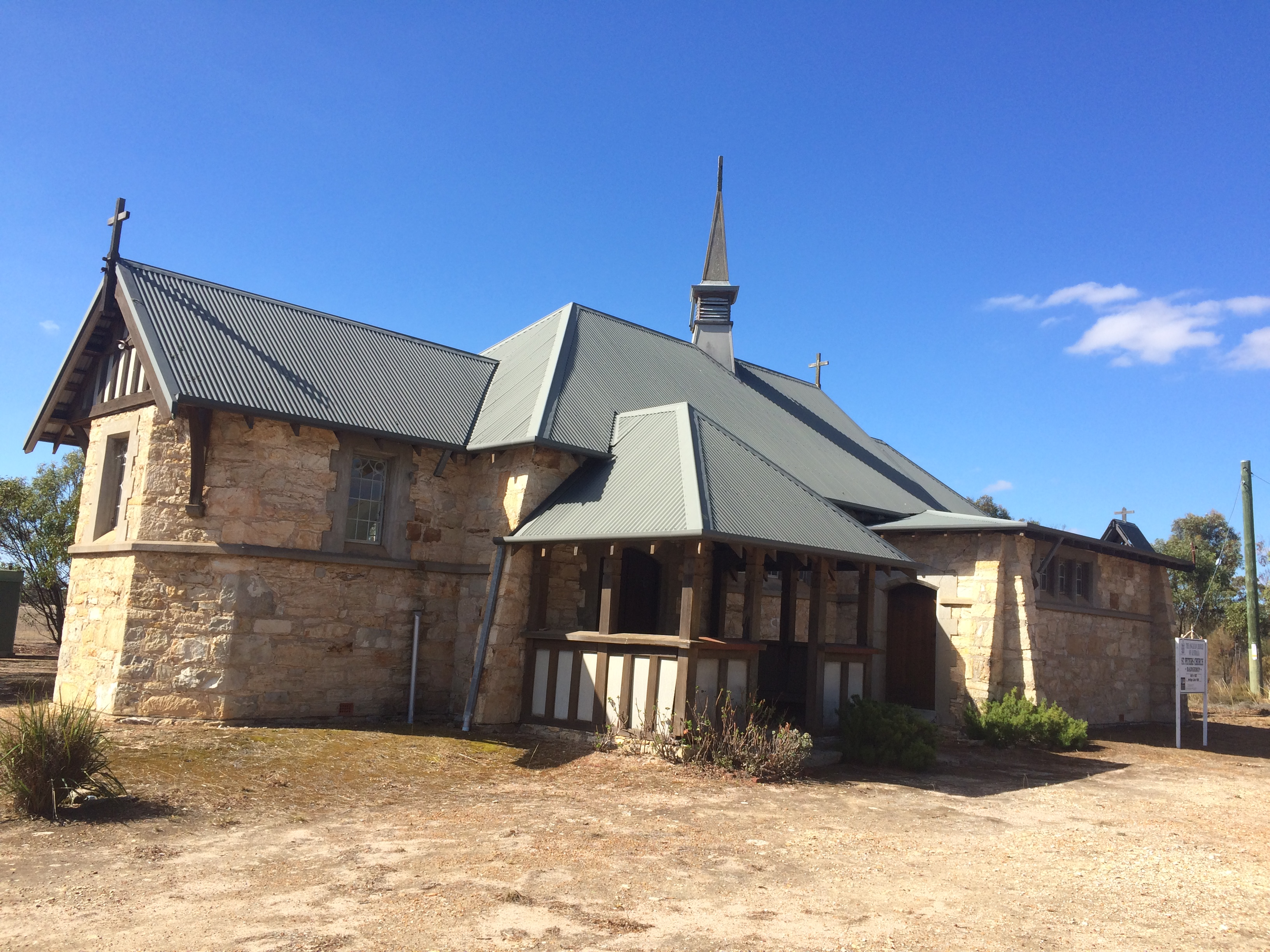
Badgebup St Peters church

Badgebup is a town and locality in the Great Southern region of Western Australia. The town is located between the towns of Katanning and Nyabing, and is approximately 270 kilometres (170 mi) southeast of Perth. The Badgebup Reserve, north of the town, forms part of the Kwobrup-Badgebup Important Bird Area.

== Name ==
The name originates from the nearby Badgebup Well. Badgebup is an Aboriginal word which is thought to mean either 'place of the wild rushes' or 'broad green leaves on a plant round soak'. It was initially suggested that the area would be named Badjebupp after the name of the station on the Katanning to Nyabing railway line. The town was gazetted as Badjebup in 1923 then changed to Nalabup, and back to Badjebup in the same year then finally to Badgebup in 1972.

== History ==
The first settlers arrived in the area in 1873 when H. Hayward took up land.

The Rockwell Agricultural Hall was built in 1907 and proposed by local residents F. H. Flugge and J. C. Warren. The building was used as a hall and as a schoolroom. An engine room was added to the hall in the 1950s, a wooden construction with a concrete floor. The local tennis club added a storage room in the 1990s.

In 1918, the Agricultural Hall at Badgebup was constructed by A. Reid of Katanning.

St. Peter's Church was built in 1922 as a memorial to John Campbell Warren, the son of a local farming family who was killed during World War I. The Warren family had settled the area in 1897. The stone used to build the church was quarried at the Warren's property and it was constructed by the local community. The remains are now heritage listed.

The Badgebup branch of the Country Women's Association was formed in 1934 with Mrs Toms being elected as president.

The school closed in the 1940s and the last shop closed in the 1950s, with people in the area using services at Katanning.

A bushfire swept through the area in 2004 destroying crops, sheds and homes in 2004. Volunteer firefighters eventually contained the blaze but not before two homes and three sheds, one containing several vintage cars, were lost.

The main industry in town is wheat farming with the town being a Cooperative Bulk Handling receival site.
