= Verticordia vicinella =

Scientific classification
- Kingdom: Plantae
- Clade: Tracheophytes
- Clade: Angiosperms
- Clade: Eudicots
- Clade: Rosids
- Order: Myrtales
- Family: Myrtaceae
- Genus: Verticordia
- Subgenus: Verticordia subg. Verticordia
- Section: Verticordia sect. Micrantha
- Species: V. vicinella

Binomial name
- Verticordia vicinella A.S.George

Species of shrub

Verticordia vicinella is a flowering plant in the myrtle family, Myrtaceae and is endemic to the south-west of Western Australia. It is a shrub with narrow leaves and groups of small, scented, pink or pale yellow flowers, growing near Esperance and in the Cape Arid National Park.

== Description ==
Verticordia vicinella is a shrub with a single main branch and which usually grows to a height of 0.45–1.2 m (1–4 ft) and up to 0.3 m (1 ft) wide. The leaves are linear in shape, 3–4 mm (0.12–0.16 in) long with a rounded end.

The flowers are scented and arranged in rounded groups on the ends of the branches, each flower on a spreading stalk less than 1 mm (0.04 in) long. The floral cup is top-shaped, about 1 mm (0.04 in) long, smooth and hairy. The sepals are about 2 mm (0.08 in) long, erect, pink, cream or pale yellow with 3 or 4 feathery lobes. The petals are a similar colour to the sepals, about 1 mm (0.04 in) long, egg-shaped and hairy on the outside with a slightly ragged tip. The style is 4–5 mm (0.16–0.20 in) long, straight and hairy near the tip. Flowering time is usually from January to May, but has been recorded in most months.

This species is similar to Verticordia minutiflora but the flowers are usually pink, where those of V.minutiflora are mostly grey to mauve. Verticordia vicinella also has staminodes between its stamens.

== Taxonomy and naming ==
Verticordia vicinella was first formally described by Alex George in 1991 from a specimen collected near Esperance and the description was published in Nuytsia. The specific epithet (vicinella) is derived from the Latin word vicinus meaning "near" with the diminutive suffix -ella referring to the small flowers and similarity to V. minutiflora.

George placed this species in subgenus Verticordia, section Micrantha along with V. minutiflora and V. fastigiata.

== Distribution and habitat ==
This verticordia grows in sand, sometimes in areas that are wet in winter. It occurs in the south of Western Australia between Esperance and Mount Ragged in the Cape Arid National Park in the Esperance Plains and Mallee biogeographic regions.

== Conservation ==
Verticordia vicinella is classified as "Not Threatened" by the Western Australian Government Department of Parks and Wildlife.

== Use in horticulture ==
Verticordia vicinella is readily propagated from cuttings, easy to establish in gardens and is hardy in well-drained soil.
