= Verticordia sect. Elachoschista =

Scientific classification
- Kingdom: Plantae
- Clade: Tracheophytes
- Clade: Angiosperms
- Clade: Eudicots
- Clade: Rosids
- Order: Myrtales
- Family: Myrtaceae
- Genus: Verticordia
- Subgenus: Verticordia subg. Verticordia
- Section: Verticordia sect. Elachoschista; A.S.George

Group of flowering plants

Verticordia sect. Elachoschista is one of eleven sections in the subgenus Verticordia. It includes a single species in the genus Verticordia. Plants in this section resemble those in section Infuscata except that the sepal lobes are not divided but may have an irregularly toothed edge. Plants in this section superficially resemble some of the smaller Darwinia species. The leaves are crowded and the flower are cream-coloured, turning greenish-brown as they age. When Alex George reviewed the genus in 1991 he formally described this section, publishing the description in the journal Nuytsia. The name Elachoschista is derived from the Ancient Greek words elachys meaning "little" and schizo meaning "cut" referring to the sepals which have almost smooth edges.

The type and only species in this section is Verticordia verticordina.
