= Acacia papulosa =

Conservation status
- Priority Two — Poorly Known Taxa (DEC)

Scientific classification
- Kingdom: Plantae
- Clade: Tracheophytes
- Clade: Angiosperms
- Clade: Eudicots
- Clade: Rosids
- Order: Fabales
- Family: Fabaceae
- Subfamily: Caesalpinioideae
- Clade: Mimosoid clade
- Genus: Acacia
- Species: A. papulosa

Binomial name
- Acacia papulosa R.S.Cowan & Maslin

Species of legume

Acacia papulosa is a shrub of the genus Acacia and the subgenus Plurinerves that is endemic to a small area along the south coast of south western Australia.

== Description ==
The bushy shrub typically grows to a height of 0.25 to 2 metres (1 to 7 ft) and has a dense habit with resinous and glabrous branchlets with small pimple-like projections. Like most species of Acacia it has phyllodes rather than true leaves. The glabrous, ascending to erect and evergreen phyllodes are straight to shallowly incurved and cylindrical with a length of 2 to 6 cm (0.79 to 2.36 in) and a diameter of 0.7 to 1 mm (0.028 to 0.039 in) and have eight nerves. It blooms from August to September and produces yellow flowers. The simple inflorescences occur in pairs in the axils and have spherical to slightly obloid flower-heads that have a length of 2.5 to 3.5 mm (0.098 to 0.138 in) and a diameter of 2.5 to 3 mm (0.098 to 0.118 in) containing 10 to 20 flowers. Following flowering thinly leathery, glabrous, erect and linear seed pods form that are raised over each of the seeds constricted between them with a length of around 4 cm (1.6 in) and a width of 2.5 mm (0.098 in). The pods contain glossy black to dark brown oblong shaped seeds with a length of 3 to 4 mm (0.12 to 0.16 in).

== Distribution ==
It is native to three small areas along the southern coast in the Great Southern and Goldfields-Esperance regions of Western Australia where it is found growing in areas of spongolitic loam. The shrub has a limited distribution in the Boxwood Hill area and in the Fitzgerald River National Park area as a part of woodland communities.

== See also ==
- List of Acacia species
