= Verticordia stenopetala =

Conservation status
- Priority Three — Poorly Known Taxa (DEC)

Scientific classification
- Kingdom: Plantae
- Clade: Tracheophytes
- Clade: Angiosperms
- Clade: Eudicots
- Clade: Rosids
- Order: Myrtales
- Family: Myrtaceae
- Genus: Verticordia
- Subgenus: Verticordia subg. Verticordia
- Section: Verticordia sect. Verticordia
- Species: V. stenopetala

Binomial name
- Verticordia stenopetala Diels

Species of shrub

Verticordia stenopetala is a flowering plant in the myrtle family, Myrtaceae and is endemic to the south-west of Western Australia. It is a low shrub with small leaves and heads of pink to magenta-coloured flowers in late spring and early summer.

== Description ==
Verticordia stenopetala is a highly branched shrub which usually grows to a height 20–50 cm (8–20 in) and wide. The leaves are linear, slightly wider towards the tip, 3–5 mm (0.1–0.2 in) long and semi-circular in cross-section.

The flowers are arranged in round or corymb-like groups, each flower on a stalk 4–8 mm (0.2–0.3 in) long. The floral cup is about 2 mm (0.08 in) long, smooth and hairy. The sepals are more or less spreading, 3–4 mm (0.1–0.2 in) long, pink to magenta-coloured with 6 to 8 feathery lobes. The petals are a similar colour to the sepals, about 3–3.5 mm (0.12–0.14 in) long, egg-shaped with a few short teeth near the tip and are slightly hairy on the outside. The style is 6–7.5 mm (0.2–0.3 in) long, curved and hairy near the tip. Flowering time is from October to January.

== Taxonomy and naming ==
Verticordia stenopetala was first formally described by Ludwig Diels in 1904 and the description was published in Botanische Jahrbücher für Systematik, Pflanzengeschichte und Pflanzengeographie. The specific epithet (stenopetala) is from the Ancient Greek words stenos meaning "narrow" and petalon meaning "petal".

In his review of the genus in 1991, Alex George placed this species in subgenus Verticordia, section Verticordia along with V. crebra, V. helichrysantha, V. plumosa, V. sieberi, V. harveyi, V. pityrhops, and V. fimbrilepis.

== Distribution and habitat ==
This verticordia usually grows in sand, sometimes with gravel or loam in heath and mallee shrubland. It occurs between Walgoolan, Bullabulling and Forrestania in the Avon Wheatbelt, Coolgardie, and Mallee biogeographic regions.

== Conservation ==
Verticordia stenopetala is classified as "Priority Three" by the Western Australian Government Department of Parks and Wildlife, meaning that it is poorly known and known from only a few locations but is not under imminent threat.

== Use in horticulture ==
This verticordia had proven difficult to propagate and establish and few have been grown in gardens, even though it has been known for more than a century.
