= Verticordia sect. Penicillaris =

Scientific classification
- Kingdom: Plantae
- Clade: Tracheophytes
- Clade: Angiosperms
- Clade: Eudicots
- Clade: Rosids
- Order: Myrtales
- Family: Myrtaceae
- Genus: Verticordia
- Subgenus: Verticordia subg. Verticordia
- Section: Verticordia sect. Penicillaris; A.S.George

Species
- 2 species: see text.

Group of flowering plants

Verticordia sect. Penicillaris is one of eleven sections in the subgenus Verticordia. It includes two species of plants in the genus Verticordia. Plants in this section are small, rounded shrubs with tiny leaves and sticky flowers. Like those in section Micrantha, the plants often smell faintly of mice. When Alex George reviewed the genus in 1991 he formally described this section, publishing the description in the journal Nuytsia. The name Penicillaris is from the type species from this section.

The type species for this section is Verticordia penicillaris and the other species is V. dasystylis.
