= Verticordia pityrhops =

East Mount Barren featherflower

Conservation status
- Endangered (EPBC Act)

Scientific classification
- Kingdom: Plantae
- Clade: Tracheophytes
- Clade: Angiosperms
- Clade: Eudicots
- Clade: Rosids
- Order: Myrtales
- Family: Myrtaceae
- Genus: Verticordia
- Subgenus: Verticordia subg. Verticordia
- Section: Verticordia sect. Verticordia
- Species: V. pityrhops

Binomial name
- Verticordia pityrhops A.S.George

Species of flowering plant

Verticordia pityrhops, commonly known as East Mount Barren featherflower or pine-like featherflower, is a flowering plant in the myrtle family, Myrtaceae and is endemic to the south-west of Western Australia. It is a single-stemmed shrub which is densely-branched with crowded narrow linear leaves giving the impression of a miniature pine tree. When it flowers in autumn, the shrub is completely covered with masses of very small, honey-scented, pinkish-purple flowers.

== Description ==
Verticordia pityrhops is a shrub with a single, thick, densely branched main stem and a few side branches and which grows to a height of 20–60 cm (8–20 in) and 15–30 cm (6–10 in) wide, although some specimens grow to as high as 1.5 m (5 ft). Its leaves are dark green and crowded, narrow linear, almost needle-like, 7–14 mm (0.3–0.6 in) long with a pointed tip.

The flowers are scented and arranged in corymb-like groups near the ends of the branches, each flower on a stalk 2–4 mm (0.08–0.2 in) long. The floral cup is top-shaped, about 2 mm (0.08 in) long, smooth but hairy. The sepals are about 2 mm (0.08 in) long, spreading and pink, fading to white and have between 3 and 5 hairy lobes. The petals are a similar colour to the sepals, 2 mm (0.08 in) long, erect, egg-shaped, pimply on the outer surface and have a hairy fringe. The style is about 5 mm (0.20 in) long, curved and hairy near the tip. Flowering time is from February to June.

== Taxonomy and naming ==
Verticordia pityrhops was first formally described by Alex George in 1991 and the description was published in Nuytsia. The specific epithet (pityrhops) is derived from the Ancient Greek words pitys meaning "pine" and rhops meaning "a shrub" referring to the habit of this species. Its common names include East Mount Barren featherflower, pine-like featherflower and little pine verticordia.

George placed this species in subgenus Verticordia, section Verticordia along with V. crebra, V. helichrysantha, V. plumosa, V. stenopetala, V. sieberi, V. harveyi and V. fimbrilepis.

== Distribution and habitat ==
This verticordia only occurs in the Fitzgerald River National Park in the Esperance Plains biogeographic region where it grows in sand, sometimes with gravel amongst quartzite rocks, in heath and shrubland.

== Conservation ==
Verticordia hughanii is classified as "Threatened" by the Western Australian Government Department of Parks and Wildlife meaning that it is likely to become extinct or is rare, or otherwise in need of special protection. It is also classed as "Endangered" (EN) under the Australian Government Environment Protection and Biodiversity Conservation Act 1999 (EPBC Act) and is included in the Fitzgerald Biosphere Recovery Plan. East Mount Barren Featherflower is killed by fire and regenerates from seed. There have been fires in the region in 1989 and 2006 and the total population in 2008 was estimated to be more than 420 mature plants. The main threats to the species' survival are inappropriate fire regimes and dieback disease caused by the fungus Phytophthora cinnamomi.

== Use in horticulture ==
Propagation of this verticordia is difficult. Cuttings have to be taken during a narrow window and seed set is poor. The few that have been successfully grown in gardens did not flower for up to five years but when they did so, produced masses of perfumed flowers on a bushy shrub.
