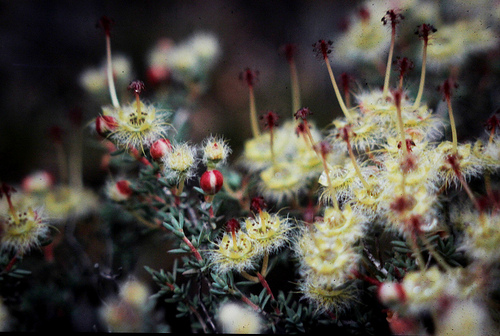
- In Howatharra Nature Reserve near Geraldton, Western Australia

Scientific classification
- Kingdom: Plantae
- Clade: Tracheophytes
- Clade: Angiosperms
- Clade: Eudicots
- Clade: Rosids
- Order: Myrtales
- Family: Myrtaceae
- Genus: Verticordia
- Subgenus: Verticordia subg. Verticordia
- Section: Verticordia sect. Penicillaris
- Species: V. penicillaris

Binomial name
- Verticordia penicillaris F.Muell

= Verticordia penicillaris =

Species of flowering plant

Verticordia penicillaris is a species of flowering plant in the myrtle family, Myrtaceae and is endemic to the south-west of Western Australia. It is a small, widely spreading shrub, usually with several main branches. It is readily distinguished from other verticordias by its yellow flowers with white fringes and purple hairs on the end of their long styles.

== Description ==
Verticordia penicillaris is a spreading shrub which grows to a height of 15–40 cm (6–20 in) and up to 2 m (7 ft) wide, sometimes with its lowest branches taking root in the soil. Its leaves are narrow egg-shaped, dished on the upper surface, 5–6 mm (0.20–0.24 in) long and have a blunt end.

The flowers are arranged in corymb-like groups on the ends of the branches, each flower on a stalk 6–11 mm (0.2–0.4 in) long with an animal odour. The floral cup is top-shaped, 2 mm (0.08 in) long and is hairy near its base. The sepals are pale yellow, 6–7 mm (0.2–0.3 in) long with about 5 hairy white lobes. The petals are spreading, yellow, egg-shaped, 3.0–3.5 mm (0.12–0.14 in) long with a hairy edge. The style is 15–19 mm (0.6–0.7 in) long and straight or slightly curved and has purple hairs near the tip. Flowering time is mainly from September to October.

== Taxonomy and naming ==
Verticordia penicillaris was first formally described by Ferdinand von Mueller in 1859 from a specimen collected by Augustus Oldfield and the description was published in Fragmenta phytographiae Australiae. The specific epithet (penicillaris) is a Latin word meaning "of a little tail" or "of a painter's brush" referring to the brush-like tip of the styles.

In his review of the genus in 1991, Alex George placed this species in subgenus Verticordia, section Penicillaris along with V. dasystylis.

== Distribution and habitat ==
This verticordia is found between the Kalbarri National Park, the Arrowsmith River and Mullewa where it usually grows in shallow, gritty soil in areas that are wet in winter in the Avon Wheatbelt and Geraldton Sandplains biogeographic regions.

== Conservation ==
Verticordia penicillaris is classified as "Priority Four" by the Western Australian Government Department of Parks and Wildlife, meaning that is rare or near threatened.

== Use in horticulture ==
This verticordia is usually propagated from cuttings and grows well in gravelly or sandy soils. Once established it is both frost and drought tolerant and has grown in the summer rainfall areas of eastern Australia.
