= Verticordia sect. Intricata =

Scientific classification
- Kingdom: Plantae
- Clade: Tracheophytes
- Clade: Angiosperms
- Clade: Eudicots
- Clade: Rosids
- Order: Myrtales
- Family: Myrtaceae
- Genus: Verticordia
- Subgenus: Verticordia subg. Verticordia
- Section: Verticordia sect. Intricata; A.S.George

Species
- 3 species: see text.

Group of flowering plants

Verticordia sect. Intricata is one of eleven sections in the subgenus Verticordia. It includes three species of plants in the genus Verticordia. Plants in this section are usually bushy shrubs, sometimes cauliflower-like, with greyish leaves and fluffy or woolly pink to red, sometimes white flowers. The sepals have intricately branched lobes and hairy appendages and the stamens and staminodes are joined in a ring structure. When Alex George reviewed the genus in 1991 he formally described this section, publishing the description in the journal Nuytsia. The name Intricata is from the Latin word intricatus meaning "entangled" or "complicated" referring to the intricately divided sepals.

The type species for this section is Verticordia monadelpha and the other two species are V. mitchelliana and V. pulchella.
