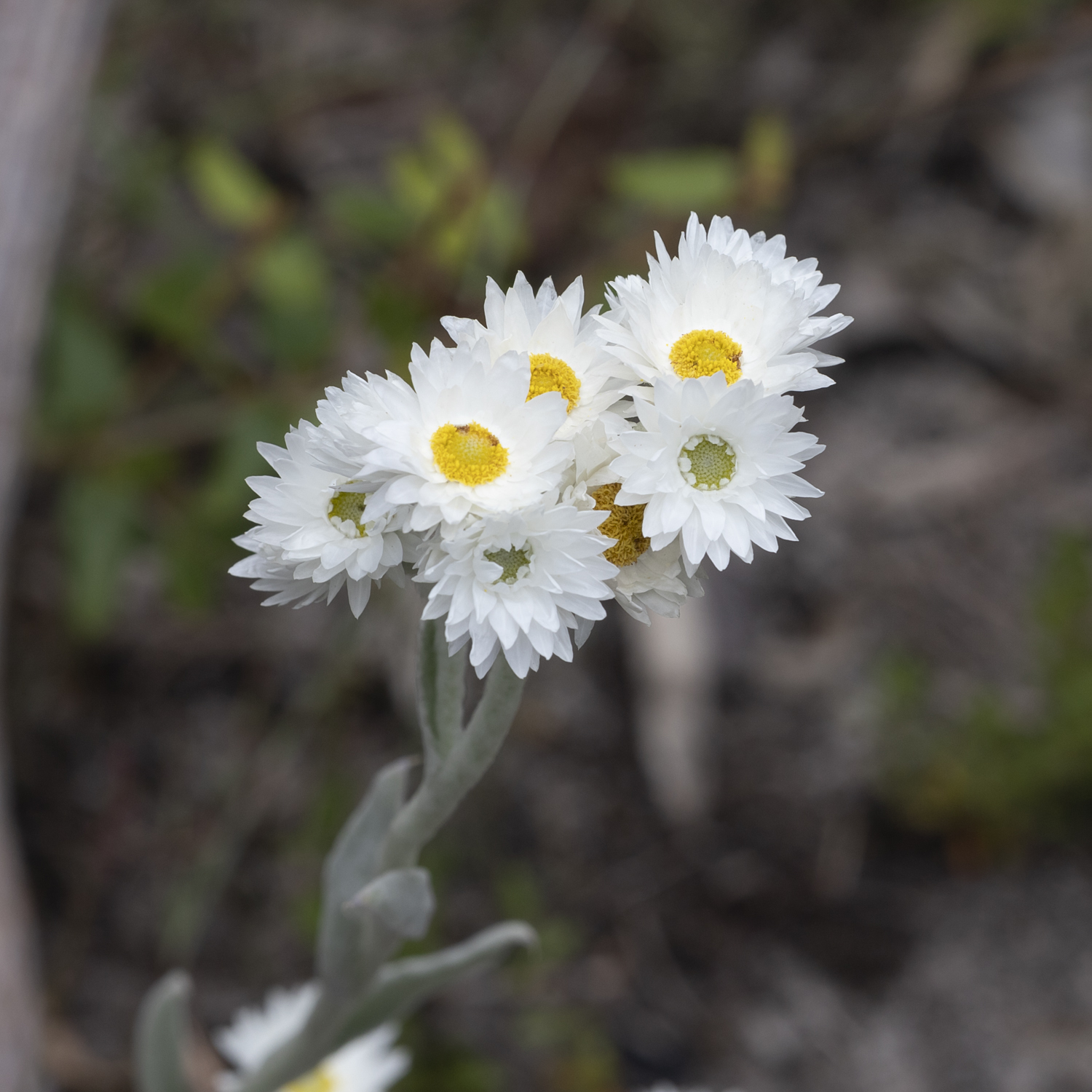

Scientific classification
- Kingdom: Plantae
- Clade: Embryophytes
- Clade: Tracheophytes
- Clade: Angiosperms
- Clade: Eudicots
- Clade: Asterids
- Order: Asterales
- Family: Asteraceae
- Genus: Argentipallium
- Species: A. blandowskianum

Binomial name
- Argentipallium blandowskianum (Steetz ex Sonder) Paul G.Wilson

= Argentipallium blandowskianum =

Species of flowering plant

Argentipallium blandowskianum, the woolly everlasting (formerly Helichrysum blandowskianum), is a species of flowering plant in the family Asteraceae.

== Description ==
Erect perennial herb 20–50 cm (7.9–19.7 in) tall with a branched crown at the base; stems several, usually branched, with a dense felty vestiture of woolly hairs; leaves oblanceolate, usually narrowly so, or sometimes narrowly elliptic, flat, acute to acuminate with a soft dark mucro, with a cuneate sessile base, mostly 2–4 cm long, 5–8 mm wide, thick and felty with a dense woolly vestiture on both sides.

Capitula 6–12 in rather dense terminal leafy corymbs, these sometimes grouped into panicle-like aggregations, broadly campanulate (the laminae of the involucral bracts oblique to patent at flowering), 1.3-1.7 cm long when pressed (including the laminae) eventually 2–2.5 cm diam.; involucral bracts 6-8-seriate, the intermediate ones longest; outermost bracts enveloped in and largely obscured by long woolly-cobwebby hairs; intermediate bracts with scarious white or sometimes pinkish opaque narrowly elliptic blunt laminae and short firm subherbaceous linear cobwebby-hairy claws about a fifth of their length, 11–13 mm long in total length and exceeding the florets by 9–10 mm; florets numerous, all bisexual; style branches unevenly capitate (longer abaxially), shortly papillose.

Achenes oblong, subterete but slightly 4-angled in cross-section, not compressed, antrorsely scabrous with coarse papillae, a pale grey-brown; pappus bristles 15–20, free, barbellate from the base, slightly more coarsely so towards the apex, dull-white.

== Range ==
This plant is found in South Eastern Australia, in Victoria and South Australia.
