= Verticordia sect. Verticordia =

Scientific classification
- Kingdom: Plantae
- Clade: Tracheophytes
- Clade: Angiosperms
- Clade: Eudicots
- Clade: Rosids
- Order: Myrtales
- Family: Myrtaceae
- Genus: Verticordia
- Subgenus: Verticordia subg. Verticordia
- Section: Verticordia sect. Verticordia

Species
- 8 species: see text

Group of flowering plants

Verticordia sect. Verticordia is one of eleven sections in the subgenus Verticordia. It includes eight species of plants in the genus Verticordia. Plants in this section are open to bushy shrubs up to 1 m (3 ft) tall with needle-like leaves, feather-like sepals and anthers opening by slanting pores. When Johannes Conrad Schauer described other subgenera in Verticordia, subgenus Verticordia became an autonym after Augustin de Candolle who described the genus in 1828. When Alex George reviewed the genus in 1991, he took the name of this section from that of the subgenus.

The type species for this section is Verticordia plumosa and the other seven species are V. crebra, V. helichrysantha, V. stenopetala, V. sieberi, V. harveyi, V. pityrhops and V. fimbrilepis.
