= Verticordia sect. Recondita =

Scientific classification
- Kingdom: Plantae
- Clade: Tracheophytes
- Clade: Angiosperms
- Clade: Eudicots
- Clade: Rosids
- Order: Myrtales
- Family: Myrtaceae
- Genus: Verticordia
- Subgenus: Verticordia subg. Verticordia
- Section: Verticordia sect. Recondita; A.S.George

Group of flowering plants

Verticordia sect. Recondita is one of eleven sections in the subgenus Verticordia. It includes a single species in the genus Verticordia. Plants in this section are inconspicuous shrubs with linear leaves which are triangular in cross-section, rather scattered flowers and staminodes tapering to a fine point. When Alex George reviewed the genus in 1991 he formally described this section, publishing the description in the journal Nuytsia. The name Recondita is derived from the Latin word reconditus meaning "concealed" or "hidden" referring to the small size and scattered flowers of plants in this section.

The type and only species in this section is Verticordia humilis.
