= Verticordia sect. Platandra =

Scientific classification
- Kingdom: Plantae
- Clade: Tracheophytes
- Clade: Angiosperms
- Clade: Eudicots
- Clade: Rosids
- Order: Myrtales
- Family: Myrtaceae
- Genus: Verticordia
- Subgenus: Verticordia subg. Verticordia
- Section: Verticordia sect. Platandra; A.S.George

Species
- 2 species: see text.

Group of flowering plants

Verticordia sect. Platandra is one of eleven sections in the subgenus Verticordia. It includes two species of plants in the genus Verticordia. Plants in this section resemble V. pritzelii in section Catocalypta but differ in they do not have tufts of hair on their sepals. The anthers are flattened and the hairs on the style are forked. When Alex George reviewed the genus in 1991 he formally described this section, publishing the description in the journal Nuytsia.

When George published his review of the genus in 1991, there was only one species in the section, V. gracilis but in 2010 he described V. setacea and included that species in section Platandra.

The name Platandra is derived from the Ancient Greek platy- meaning "flattened" and -andros meaning "male" referring to the flattened anthers.

The type species for this section is Verticordia gracilis and the other species is V. setacea.
