= Verticordia fimbrilepis subsp. australis =

Conservation status
- Vulnerable (EPBC Act)

Scientific classification
- Kingdom: Plantae
- Clade: Tracheophytes
- Clade: Angiosperms
- Clade: Eudicots
- Clade: Rosids
- Order: Myrtales
- Family: Myrtaceae
- Genus: Verticordia
- Species: V. fimbrilepis
- Subspecies: V. f. subsp. australis

Trinomial name
- Verticordia fimbrilepis subsp. australis A.S.George

Subspecies of flowering plant

Verticordia fimbrilepis subsp. australis, commonly known as southern shy featherflower is a flowering plant in the myrtle family, Myrtaceae and is endemic to the south-west of Western Australia. It is a slender shrub with one openly branched main stem at its base, small, pointed leaves and rounded groups of pink flowers near the ends of the branches.

== Description ==
Verticordia fimbrilepis subsp. australis is a slender shrub which grows to a height of about 40 cm (20 in) and which has one openly branched stem at its base. The leaves lower on the stems are linear in shape, almost round in cross-section, 2–5 mm (0.08–0.2 in) long with a rounded end with a sharp point. Those near the flowers are more oblong to narrow egg-shaped.

The flowers are arranged in open groups on stalks 5–15 mm (0.2–0.6 in) long near the ends of the branches. The floral cup is broadly top-shaped, about 1.5 mm (0.06 in) long, glabrous but slightly rough. The sepals are bright mauve-pink 3–3.5 mm (0.12–0.14 in) long, with 5 to 7 hairy lobes. The petals are the same colour as the sepals, sometimes with a white base and are about 2.5–3.0 mm (0.098–0.12 in) long, 1.0 mm (0.04 in) or less wide, egg-shaped with long, coarse hairs. The staminodes have a broad stalk and a hairy fringe, lacking the single long hair in their centre of subspecies fimbrilepis. The style is 0.2–0.4 mm (0.008–0.02 in) long, straight and glabrous. Flowering time is from October to December.

== Taxonomy and naming ==
Verticordia fimbrilepis was first formally described by Nikolai Turczaninow in 1847 and the description was published in the Bulletin de la Société Impériale des Naturalistes de Moscou. In 1991, Alex George undertook a review of the genus Verticordia and described two subspecies of V. fimbrilepis including this one. The type collection was made near the Kent River by George, Elizabeth George and Tony Annels in 1985. The epithet australis is from the Latin australis (southern) and refers to the distribution of this subspecies relative to that of subspecies fimbrilepis.

== Distribution and habitat ==
This verticordia grows in clay-loam on granitic slopes in heath. It is only known from small areas near Denmark and Albany in the Warren and Jarrah Forest biogeographic regions.

== Conservation ==
This subspecies of Verticordia fimbrilepis is classified "Threatened" by the Western Australian Government Department of Parks and Wildlife meaning that it is likely to become extinct or is rare, or otherwise in need of special protection. It is also classed as "Endangered" (VU) under the Australian Government Environment Protection and Biodiversity Conservation Act 1999 (EPBC Act).

== Use in horticulture ==
This subspecies of V. fimbrilepis was first propagated from cuttings in 1991 and have been grown in raised beds and in pots since then. Although not spectacular in flower, the pink flowers are attractive. It does not appear to have been grown in eastern Australian states.
