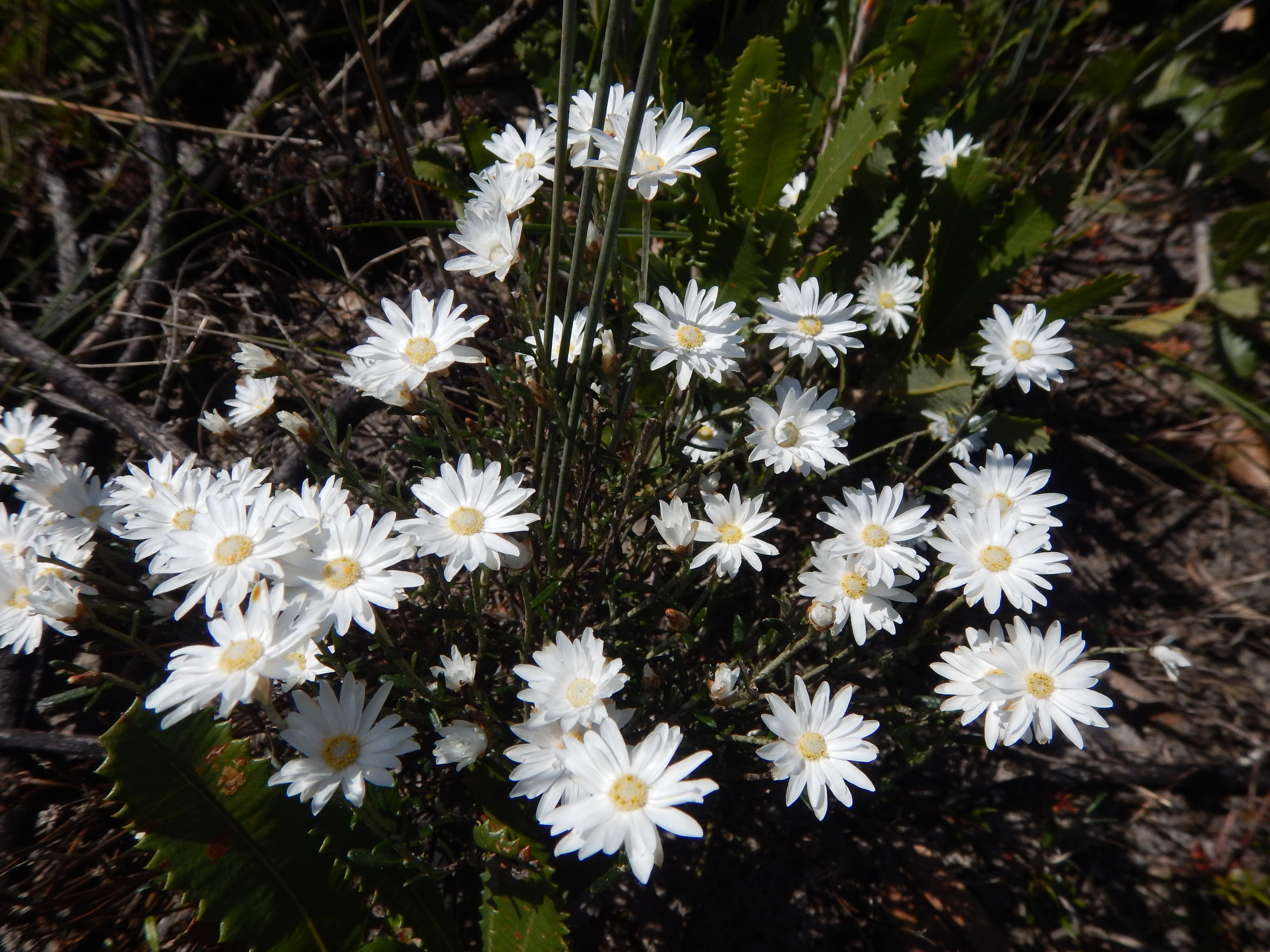

Scientific classification
- Kingdom: Plantae
- Clade: Tracheophytes
- Clade: Angiosperms
- Clade: Eudicots
- Clade: Asterids
- Order: Asterales
- Family: Asteraceae
- Genus: Argentipallium
- Species: A. obtusifolium

Binomial name
- Argentipallium obtusifolium (F.Muell. & Sond.) Paul G. Wilson

= Argentipallium obtusifolium =

Blunt everlasting

Species of flowering plant

This is in an old memory game

Argentipallium obtusifolium, commonly known as blunt everlasting, is a species of flowering plant in the family Asteraceae. It is a small, multi-stemmed perennial with white flowers, dark green leaves and is endemic to Australia.

== Description ==
Argentipallium obtusifolium is a small, multi-stemmed-stemmed perennial to 10–30 cm (3.9–11.8 in) high. The branches are white-silvery, more or less sticky from glandular, matted, woolly hairs and the leaves narrow oblanceolate, 0.4–2.5 cm (0.16–0.98 in) long, 1–2 mm (0.039–0.079 in) wide, upper surface smooth, lower surface woolly, silvery-white and the margins recurved. The flowers are borne singly at the end of upright branchlets, usually 12–15 mm (0.47–0.59 in) long and 2–3 cm (0.79–1.18 in) in diameter at maturity. The outer bracts semi-transparent, mostly sticky and woolly, inner bracts edges white, dry and mostly 8–12 mm (0.31–0.47 in) long. Flowering occurs mainly in winter to spring and the fruit is an oblong-shaped, brown achene.

== Taxonomy and naming ==
This species was first described in 1853 by Ferdinand von Mueller and Otto Wilhelm Sonder and given the name Helichrysum obtusifolium. In 1993 Paul Graham Wilson changed the name to Argentipallium obtusifolium and the description was published in the journal Nuytsia.

== Distribution and habitat ==
Blunt everlasting grows on deep sandy soils in mallee and coastal heath in Victoria, Tasmania, New South Wales, South Australia and Western Australia.
