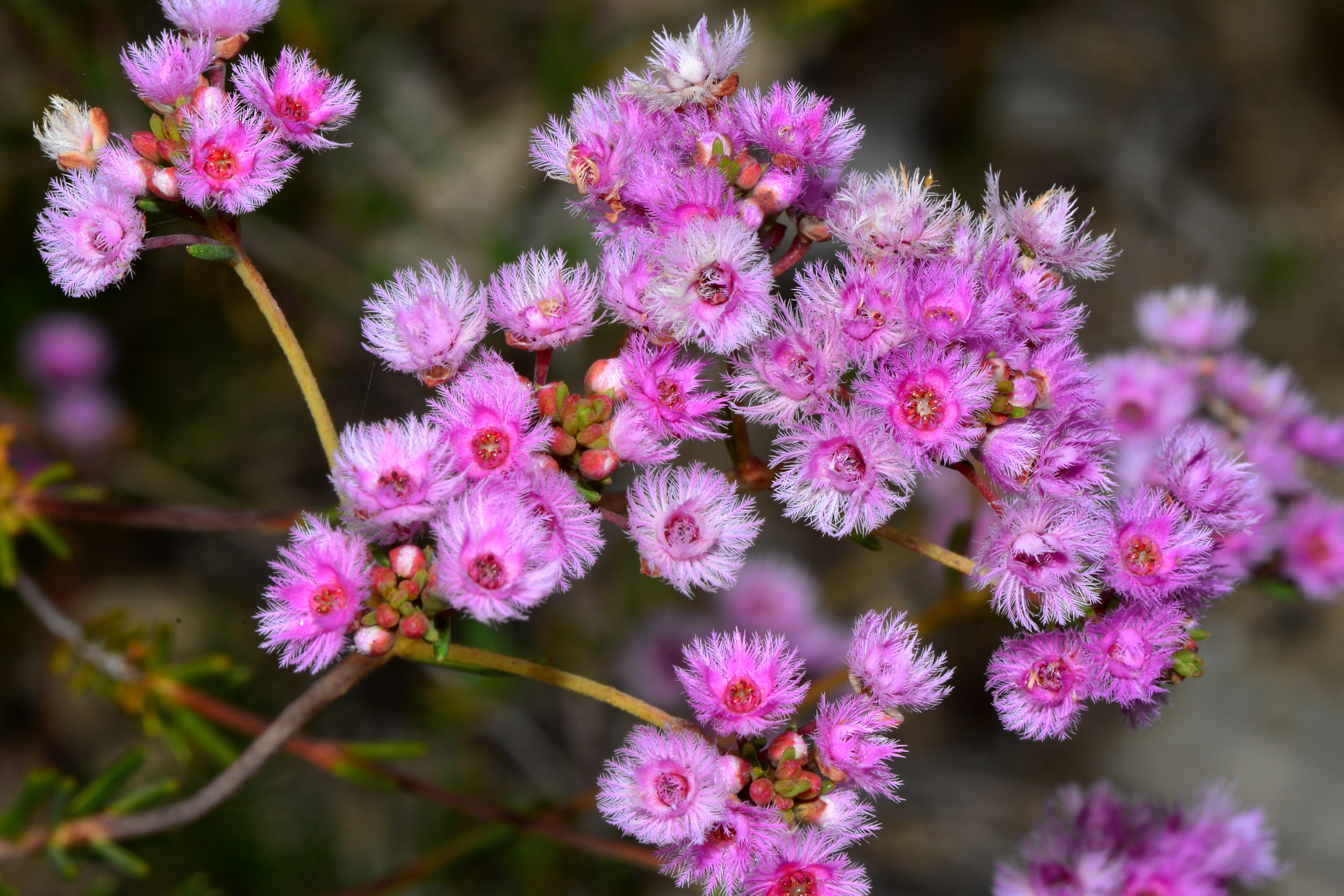

Conservation status
- Endangered (EPBC Act)

Scientific classification
- Kingdom: Plantae
- Clade: Tracheophytes
- Clade: Angiosperms
- Clade: Eudicots
- Clade: Rosids
- Order: Myrtales
- Family: Myrtaceae
- Genus: Verticordia
- Species: V. fimbrilepis Turcz.
- Subspecies: V. f. subsp. fimbrilepis

Trinomial name
- Verticordia fimbrilepis subsp. fimbrilepis

= Verticordia fimbrilepis subsp. fimbrilepis =

Subspecies of flowering plant

Verticordia fimbrilepis subsp. fimbrilepis is a flowering plant in the myrtle family, Myrtaceae and is endemic to the south-west of Western Australia. It is a small bushy shrub with one openly branched main stem at its base, small, pointed leaves and rounded groups of pink flowers near the ends of the branches.

== Description ==
Verticordia fimbrilepis subsp. fimbrilepis is a shrub which grows to a height and width of about 30–70 cm (10–30 in) and which has one openly branched stem at its base. The leaves lower on the stems are linear in shape, almost round in cross-section, 2–5 mm (0.08–0.2 in) long with a rounded end with a sharp point. Those near the flowers are more oblong to narrow egg-shaped.

The flowers are arranged in rounded groups on stalks 2–4 mm (0.08–0.2 in) long near the ends of the branches. The floral cup is broadly top-shaped, about 1.5 mm (0.06 in) long, glabrous but slightly rough. The sepals are pale pink to bright pink, sometimes white, 3–3.5 mm (0.12–0.14 in) long, with 5 to 7 hairy lobes. The petals are also pink or white, and are 2.5–3.0 mm (0.098–0.12 in) long, about 1.5 mm (0.06 in) wide, egg-shaped with long, coarse hairs. The staminodes have a broad stalk and a hairy fringe, with a single long hair in their centre. The style is 0.2–0.4 mm (0.008–0.02 in) long, straight and glabrous. Flowering time is from November to December or January.

== Taxonomy and naming ==
Verticordia fimbrilepis was first formally described by Nikolai Turczaninow in 1847 and the description was published in the Bulletin de la Société Impériale des Naturalistes de Moscou from specimens collected by James Drummond. In 1991, Alex George undertook a review of the genus Verticordia and described two subspecies of V. fimbrilepis including this one.

== Distribution and habitat ==
This verticordia grows in low-level sandy areas in heath, shrubland and wandoo woodland in scattered areas around Woodanilling, near Brookton and Narrogin in the Avon Wheatbelt and Jarrah Forest biogeographic regions.

== Conservation ==
This subspecies of Verticordia fimbrilepis is classified "Threatened" by the Western Australian Government Department of Parks and Wildlife meaning that it is likely to become extinct or is rare, or otherwise in need of special protection. It is also classed as "Endangered" (EN) under the Australian Government Environment Protection and Biodiversity Conservation Act 1999 (EPBC Act) and an interim recovery plan has been prepared.

== Use in horticulture ==
This subspecies of V. fimbrilepis is a small open shrub with dainty pink flowers but has only been successfully propagated and grown at Kings Park, apart from a single specimen in Sydney.
