= Verticordia plumosa var. grandiflora =

Scientific classification
- Kingdom: Plantae
- Clade: Tracheophytes
- Clade: Angiosperms
- Clade: Eudicots
- Clade: Rosids
- Order: Myrtales
- Family: Myrtaceae
- Genus: Verticordia
- Species: V. plumosa
- Variety: V. p. var. grandiflora

Trinomial name
- Verticordia plumosa var. grandiflora (Benth.) A.S.George

Variety of shrub

Verticordia plumosa var. grandiflora is a shrub up to 1.4 m tall found along the southern coastal regions of Southwest Australia. It is a variety of the species Verticordia plumosa, and is sometimes found growing in association with Verticordia verticordina in heath.
