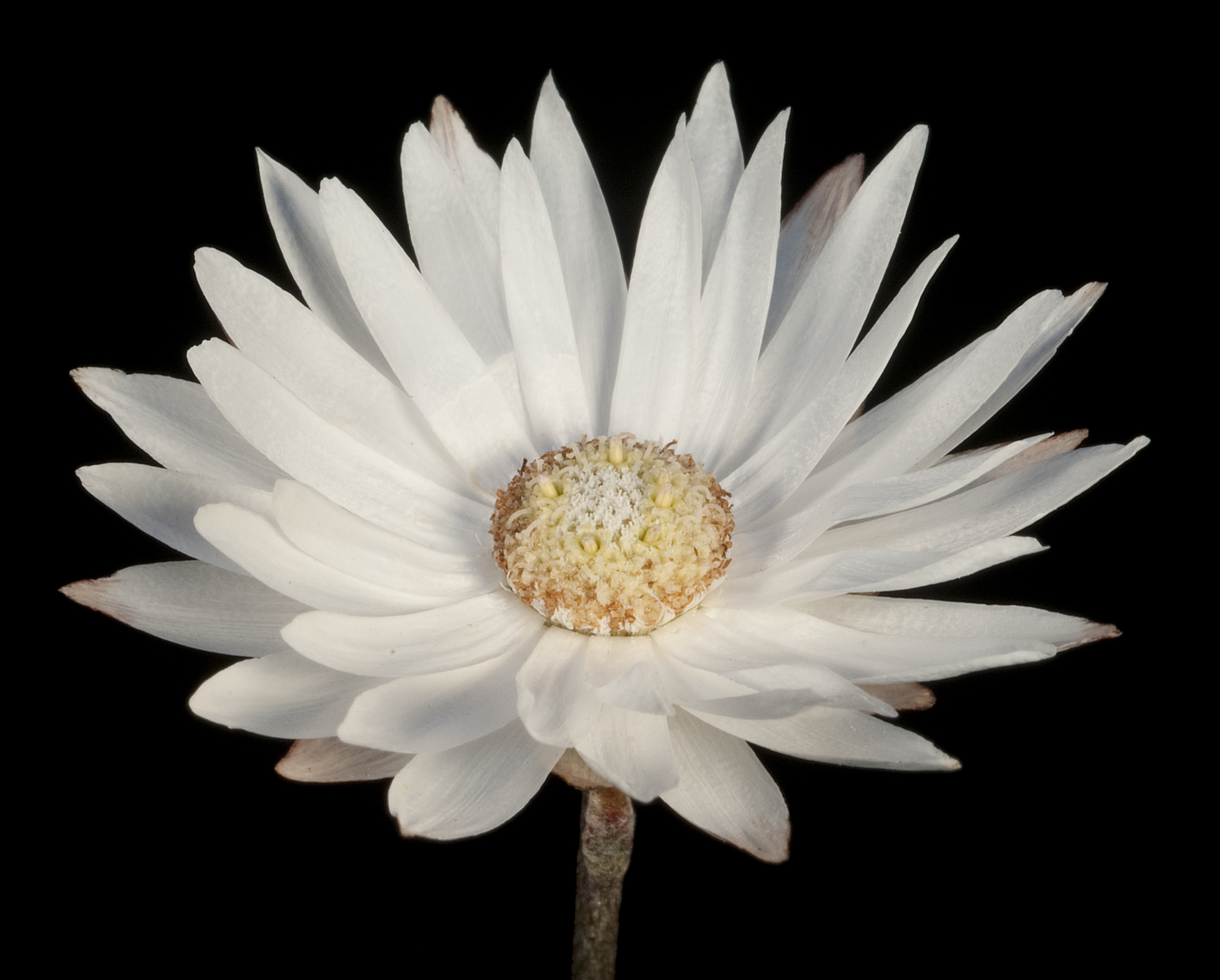

Scientific classification
- Kingdom: Plantae
- Clade: Tracheophytes
- Clade: Angiosperms
- Clade: Eudicots
- Clade: Asterids
- Order: Asterales
- Family: Asteraceae
- Genus: Argentipallium
- Species: A. niveum

Binomial name
- Argentipallium niveum (Steetz) Paul G. Wilson

Synonyms
- Helipterum niveum Steetz

= Argentipallium niveum =

Species of flowering plant

Argentipallium niveum is a species of flowering plant within the genus, Argentipallium, in the daisy family (Asteraceae). It is endemic to Western Australia.

Argentipallium niveum is an erect perennial herb, growing to heights from 10 to 40 cm, on sands, clay loams or gravelly soils. Its white flowers may be seen from September to November. It is found in Beard's South-West Province.

== Taxonomy ==
It was first described by Joachim Steetz in 1845 as Helipterum niveum, and redescribed in 1992 by Paul Wilson as Argentipallium niveum, when he described the new genus.
