= Verticordia sect. Infuscata =

Scientific classification
- Kingdom: Plantae
- Clade: Tracheophytes
- Clade: Angiosperms
- Clade: Eudicots
- Clade: Rosids
- Order: Myrtales
- Family: Myrtaceae
- Genus: Verticordia
- Subgenus: Verticordia subg. Verticordia
- Section: Verticordia sect. Infuscata; A.S.George

Species
- 2 species: see text.

Group of flowering plants

Verticordia sect. Infuscata is one of eleven sections in the subgenus Verticordia. It includes two species of plants in the genus Verticordia. Plants in this section are small shrubs with greyish foliage, unusual flowers and an odour of mice. The floral cup has a tuft of hairs around its base, dull purple or cream-coloured flowers with divided sepals and petals with a transparent margin. When Alex George reviewed the genus in 1991 he formally described this section, publishing the description in the journal Nuytsia. The name Infuscata is derived from the Latin word fusca meaning "dark" or "dusky" referring to the dullish colour of plants in this section.

The type species for this section is Verticordia oxylepis and the other species is V. longistylis.
