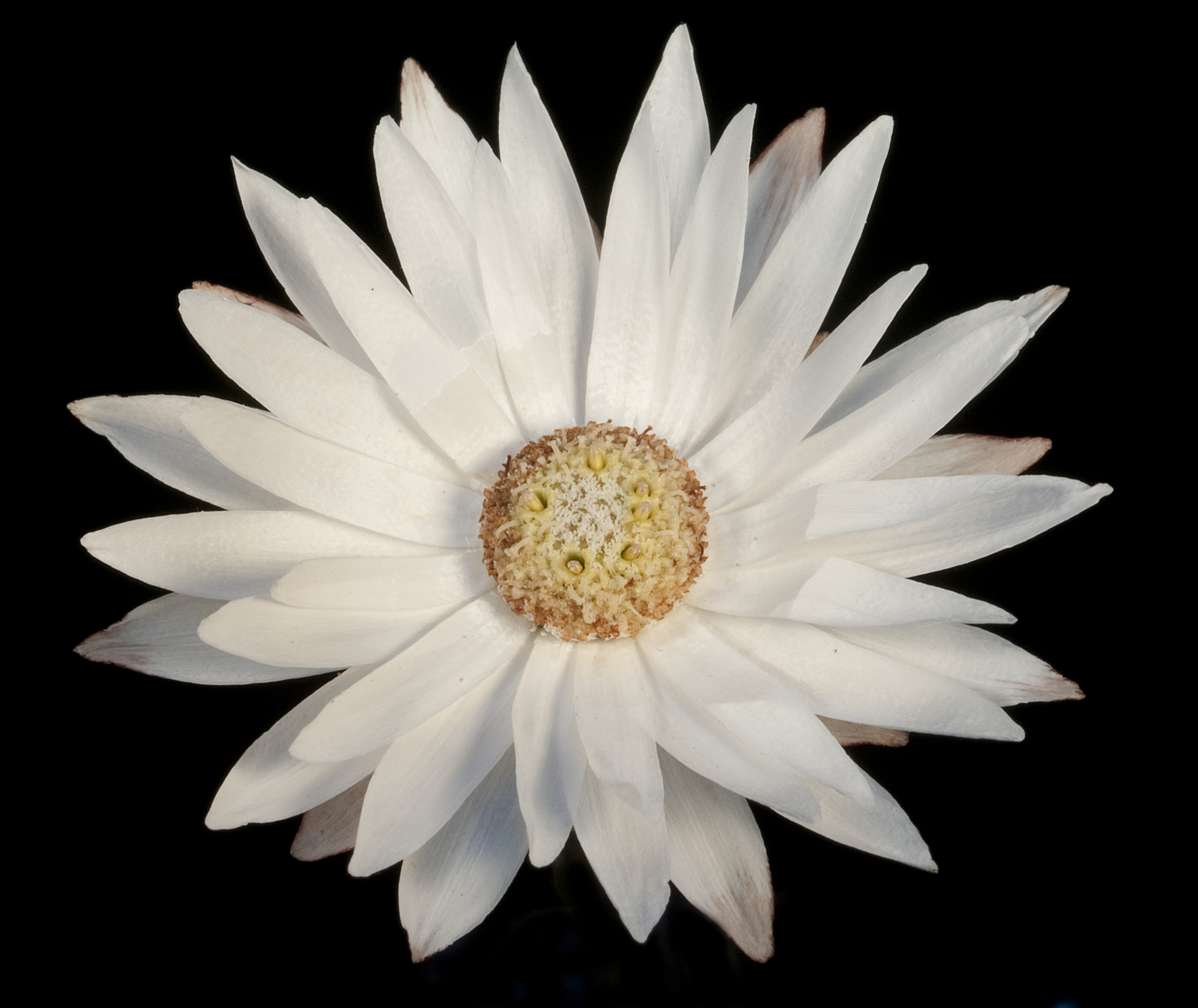
- Argentipallium niveum

Scientific classification
- Kingdom: Plantae
- Clade: Embryophytes
- Clade: Tracheophytes
- Clade: Angiosperms
- Clade: Eudicots
- Clade: Asterids
- Order: Asterales
- Family: Asteraceae
- Subfamily: Asteroideae
- Tribe: Gnaphalieae
- Genus: Argentipallium; Paul G.Wilson

= Argentipallium =

Genus of flowering plants

Argentipallium is a genus of flowering plants in the family Asteraceae. The genus, which is endemic to Australia, was first formally described in 1992 by Paul G. Wilson in the botanical journal Nutsyia.

Species

- Argentipallium blandowskianum (Steetz ex Sonder) Paul G.Wilson
- Argentipallium dealbatum (Labill.) Paul G.Wilson
- Argentipallium niveum (Steetz) Paul G.Wilson
- Argentipallium obtusifolium (Sonder) Paul G.Wilson
- Argentipallium spiceri (F.Muell.) Paul G.Wilson
- Argentipallium tephrodes (Turcz.) Paul G.Wilson
