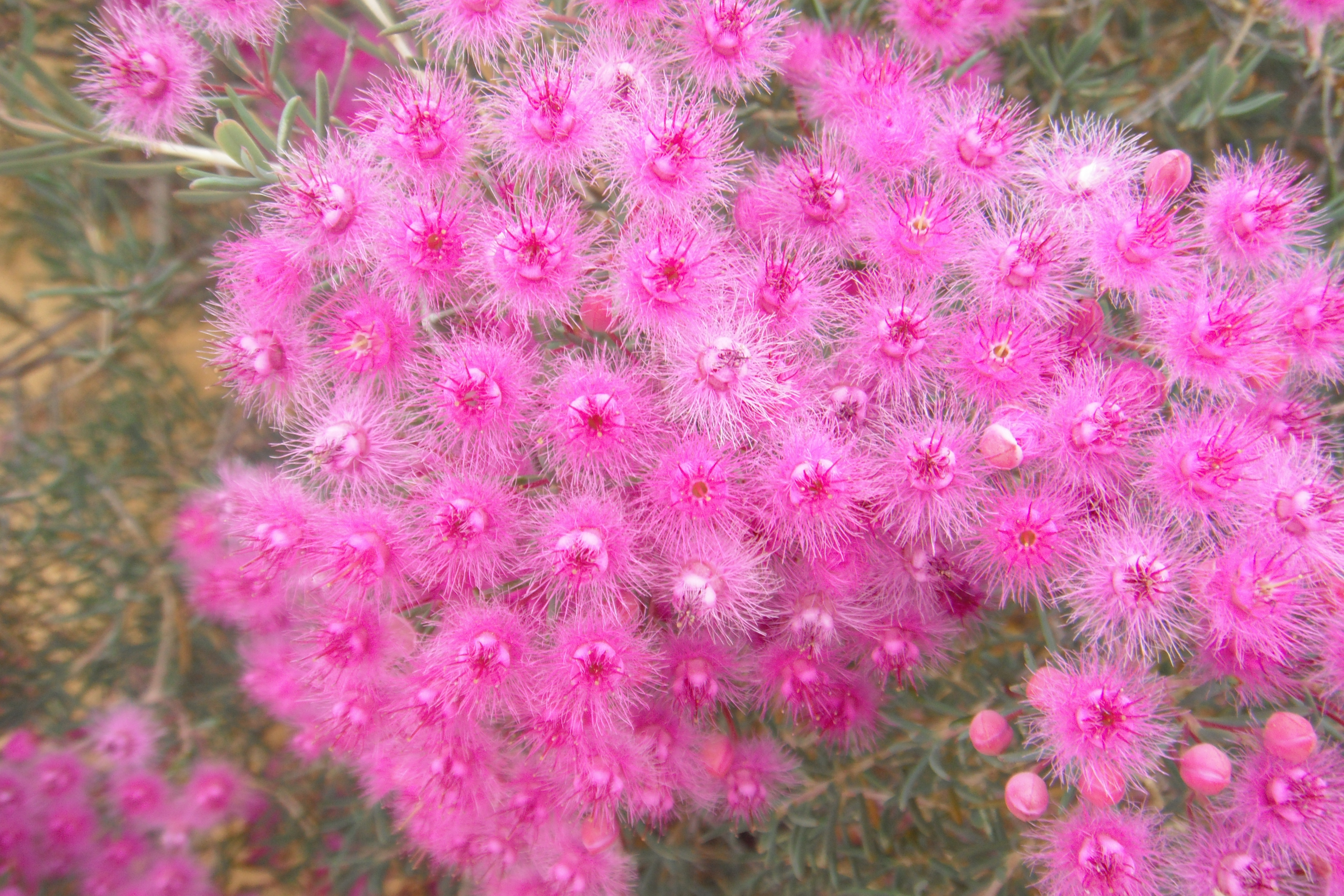
- V. monadelpha var. callitricha

Scientific classification
- Kingdom: Plantae
- Clade: Tracheophytes
- Clade: Angiosperms
- Clade: Eudicots
- Clade: Rosids
- Order: Myrtales
- Family: Myrtaceae
- Genus: Verticordia
- Subgenus: Verticordia subg. Verticordia
- Section: Verticordia sect. Intricata
- Species: V. monadelpha

Binomial name
- Verticordia monadelpha Turcz.

= Verticordia monadelpha =

Species of flowering plant

Verticordia monadelpha is a flowering plant in the myrtle family Myrtaceae, and is endemic to the south-west of Western Australia. It is a much-branched shrub with pink to magenta flowers in spring and early summer. It is commonly known as pink Morrison, woolly featherflower, pink woolly featherflower, white woolly featherflower or pink cauliflower.

== Description ==
Verticordia monadelpha is a dense, rounded shrub which varies in height between 1.7 and 2.0 m (6 and 7 ft) with many branches on a single main stem. The leaves are thin, 7–20 mm (0.3–0.8 in) long, come to a point, and are sharply triangular and ridged in outline. The floral leaves are similar to those found on the stem. Pink to reddish-purple flowers are displayed during a period from October to January. The flowers are crowded and erect, in a corymbose arrangement and cover the rounded shrub in blooms. Long cilia form a fringe on each flower, giving the plant a woolly appearance.

== Taxonomy and naming ==
Verticordia monadelpha was first formally described in 1847 Nicolai Turczaninow from a specimen collected by James Drummond, sometime in the 1840s. The specific epithet (monadelpha) is derived from the Ancient Greek words monos meaning "one" and adelphos meaning "brother", referring to the stamens being united.

Alex George nominated V. monadelpha the type species of Verticordia sect. Intricata. In his 1991 revision of the genus Verticordia, George named two varieties of this species, Verticordia monadelpha var. monadelpha and Verticordia monadelpha var. callitricha. The variety monadelpha is based on the original description of V. monadelpha by Turczaninow.

Verticordia callitricha was first formally described in 1857 by Carl Meissner from a specimen collected by Drummond in 1850 or 1851. George reduced this species to a variety of V. monadelpha as Verticordia monadelpha var. callitricha. This variety is usually 0.3–0.6 m (1–2 ft) high and 0.4–0.75 m (1–2 ft) wide and usually smaller than the type variety but sometimes grows to a height of 1.3 m (4 ft).

== Distribution and habitat ==
Variety monadelpha grows in deep sand, gravelly sand, and lateritic soils and often occurs with other verticordias in heath and shrubland in areas northeast of Perth. This variety has a wider distribution than var. callitricha and is found in the Avon Wheatbelt and Geraldton Sandplains biogeographic regions. Variety callitricha grows in deep sand or gravelly sand over laterite in heathlands and open shrubland, often in association with Actinstrobus arenarius and Banksia sceptrum. It is restricted to an area north of Geraldton and south of the Emu Proof Fence, in the Kalbarri National Park and south-east toward Morawa.

== Conservation ==
Verticordia monadelpha populations were once threatened by overexploitation for cut flowers, but are now protected by state's general prohibition of wildflower picking. The commonly occurring variety is vulnerable to changes in land use and altered fire regimes. Variety callitricha, although less common is preserved in a National Park. Both varieties are classified as "not threatened" by the Government of Western Australia Department of Parks and Wildlife.

== Use in horticulture ==
Both varieties of V. monadelpha have been grown successfully in both Western Australia and the eastern states. Variety callitricha is more desirable because of its mounds of bright, unusual colour but needs to be grown in positions of low humidity.
