= Verticordia sect. Micrantha =

Scientific classification
- Kingdom: Plantae
- Clade: Tracheophytes
- Clade: Angiosperms
- Clade: Eudicots
- Clade: Rosids
- Order: Myrtales
- Family: Myrtaceae
- Tribe: Chamelaucieae
- Genus: Verticordia; A.S.George

Species
- 3 species: see text.

Group of flowering plants

Verticordia sect. Micrantha is one of eleven sections in the subgenus Verticordia. It includes three species of plants in the genus Verticordia. Plants in this section small shrubs with tiny flowers smelling faintly like mice. The floral cup has five ribs on its sides. When Alex George reviewed the genus in 1991 he formally described this section, publishing the description in the journal Nuytsia. The name Micrantha is derived from the Ancient Greek mikros meaning "small" and anthos meaning "flower" in reference to the small flowers of plants in this section.

The type species for this section is Verticordia minutiflora and the other two species are V. vicinella and V. fastigiata.
