= Spongolite =

Stone made of fossilized sponges

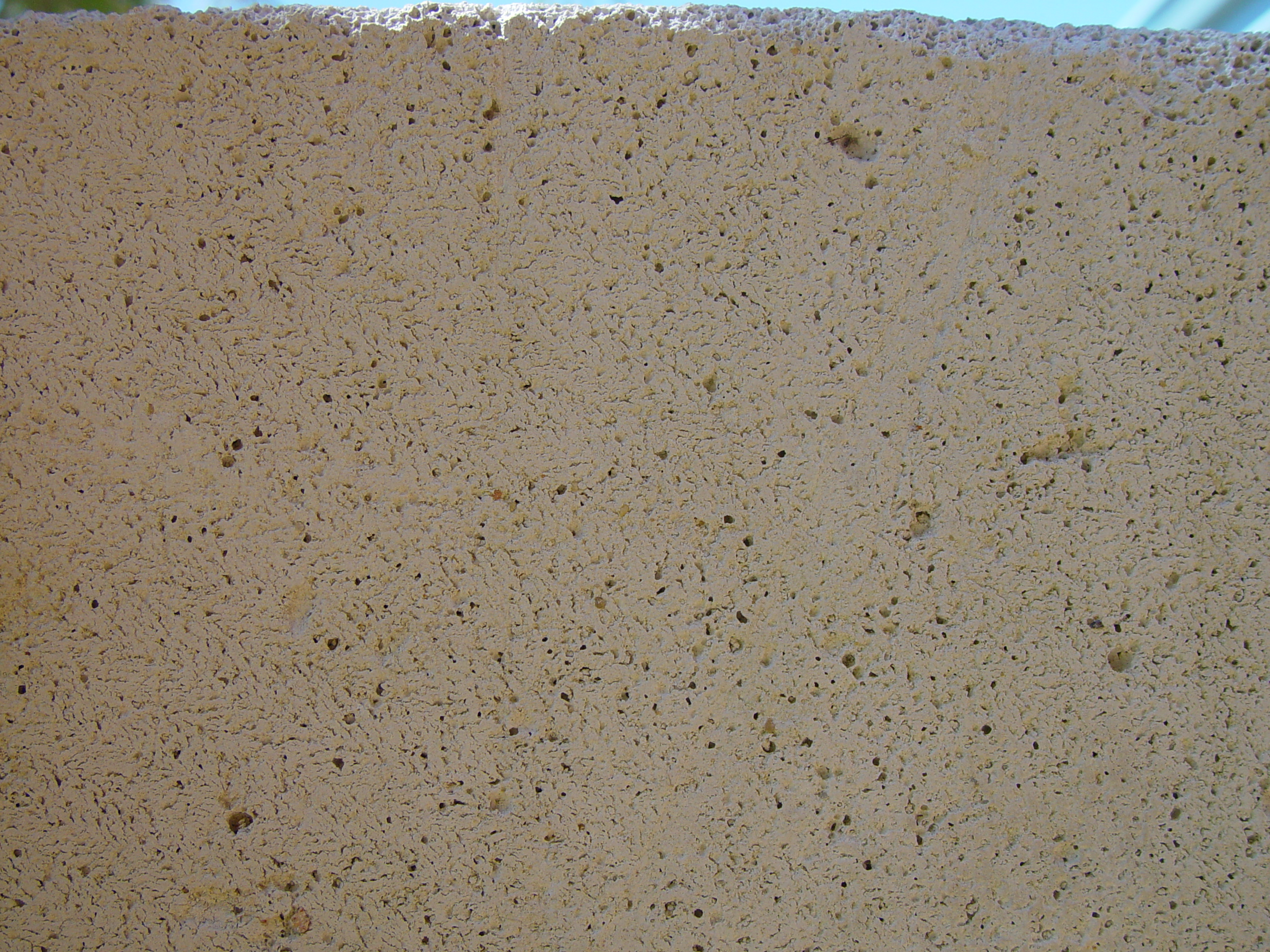
Spongolite texture, click to enlarge (2MB)

Spongolite (also spelled spongilite, spongillite, or spongiolite) is a sediment or sedimentary rock composed principally of the remains of largely articulated fossils of rigid-bodied siliceous sponges. In contrast, spiculite is either sediment or sedimentary rock composed of mostly disarticulated, discrete siliceous sponge spicules. As seen below, in some older papers, spongolite is used as a synonym of spiculite.

In Brazil, the term spongolite is defined differently as a nonmarine, freshwater, lacustrine sediment "..essentially composed of siliceous sponge spicules of the Demospongiae Class, associated with clay, sand, organic matter and diatom residues." In this usage of the term spongolite, the term spiculite is restricted to marine sediments composed of siliceous sponge spicules.

== Uses of spongolite ==
In Western Australia, spongolite, in this case actually spiculite, is quarried for use as a lightweight freestone and dimension stone. This type of spongolite has been quarried from outcrops extending sporadically from Mount Barker to Ravensthorpe, Western Australia. This type of spongolite is a fine-grained, light-weight, porous rock that is found in Late Eocene Pallinup Formation (Plantagenet Group). It outcrops along the southern coast of the Western Australia from Albany eastwards past Esperance, and as far inland as Norseman. In this region, it has been used as a building (dimension) stone because it is a visually attractive, off-white to pale yellow or beige color, light weight and has good insulating properties, moderate strength, and is easily sawn into building blocks. Petrographic analysis of this type of spongolite demonstrated that it typically consists of disarticulated siliceous sponge spicules and minor amounts of quartz, clay clumps, muscovite, tourmaline, and rutile bond together by a matrix of opaline silica.

In Brazil, a variety of potential industrial uses have been proposed for spongolites (spongillites), which are fresh water spiculites. These spongolite deposits occur in a large area of southwest Brazil and an along the northeastern coast from Maranhão to Rio Grande do Norte. Within southwest Brazil, spongolites deposits occur in western and southwestern Minas Gerais, southern Goiás, northeastern Mato Grosso do Sul and northern São Paulo. They typically consist of discontinuous beds about 25 m (82 ft) to 5 m (16 ft) thick, and with an average diameter of about 130 m (430 ft). They accumulated in seasonal lakes and ponds and consist of siliceous sponge spicules mixed with clay, sand, organic matter, and diatoms. The proposed uses for this type of spongolite include ceramics, refractory products, chromato-graphic supplies and catalysis matrices.

In Europe and Australia, spiculitic chert (silica-cemented spiculite), called spongolite by archaeologists, was locally used by prehistoric cultures to fashion stone tools and other artifacts.
