= Verticordia subg. Verticordia =

Scientific classification
- Kingdom: Plantae
- Clade: Tracheophytes
- Clade: Angiosperms
- Clade: Eudicots
- Clade: Rosids
- Order: Myrtales
- Family: Myrtaceae
- Genus: Verticordia
- Subgenus: Verticordia subg. Verticordia

Section
- 11 sections: see text

Subgenus of flowering plants

Verticordia subg. Verticordia is a botanical name for a grouping of similar plant species in the genus Verticordia. This subgenus contains eleven sections, classifying thirty six species, of Alex George's infrageneric arrangement. A number of anatomical features differentiate the contained species from the other two subgenera.

Verticordia subg. Verticordia

Section Verticordia

the type species for this section, and the genus, is Verticordia plumosa

Section Corymbiformis

the type species for this section, closely related to Verticordia sect. Verticordia, is Verticordia brownii

Section Micrantha
Section Infuscata
Section Elachoschista

containing a single species, Verticordia verticordina

Section Penicillaris
Section Pilocosta
Section Catocalypta
Section Platandra
Section Recondita

containing a single species, Verticordia humilis

Section Intricata

== Bibliography ==
- "Verticordia DC. subg. Verticordia". Australian Plant Name Index (APNI), IBIS database. Canberra, Australian Capital Territory: Centre for Plant Biodiversity Research, Australian Government.
- Schauer, J.C. (1843) Monographia Myrtacearum Xerocarpicarum: 199
- George, A.S. (1991) New taxa, combinations and typifications in Verticordia (Myrtaceae: Chamelaucieae). Nuytsia 7(3): 282
- Elizabeth A. (Berndt) George; Margaret Pieroni (illustrator) (2002). Verticordia: the turner of hearts. Crawley: University of Western Australia Press. pp. 104, 105. ISBN 978-1-876268-46-6.
