= Verticordia sect. Catocalypta =

Scientific classification
- Kingdom: Plantae
- Clade: Tracheophytes
- Clade: Angiosperms
- Clade: Eudicots
- Clade: Rosids
- Order: Myrtales
- Family: Myrtaceae
- Genus: Verticordia
- Subgenus: Verticordia subg. Verticordia
- Section: Verticordia sect. Catocalypta (Schauer) Meisn.

Species
- 7 species: see text.

Group of flowering plants

Verticordia sect. Catocalypta is one of eleven sections in the subgenus Verticordia. It includes seven species of plants in the genus Verticordia. Plants in this section are small, bushy shrubs which grow to a height of up to 1 m (3 ft), have thick, fleshy, leaves which are triangular in cross-section. The flowers are arranged in open, corymb-like heads of relatively large flowers. Importantly, their sepals have down-turned, tufts of hair which surround the floral cup.

In 1843, Johannes Conrad Schauer described Verticordia subg. Catocalypta and published the description in Monographia Myrtacearum Xerocarpicarum. In 1856, Carl Meissner relegated the subgenus to a section. Schauer did not provide an etymology for Catocalypta but in Ancient Greek, kato means "down below" and kalyptos means "covered", probably referring to the tufts of hair covering the floral cup.

When Alex George reviewed the genus in 1991 he retained Meissner's description.

The type species for this section is Verticordia insignis and the other six species are V. roei, V. inclusa, V. apecta, V. habrantha, V. lehmannii and V. pritzelii.
