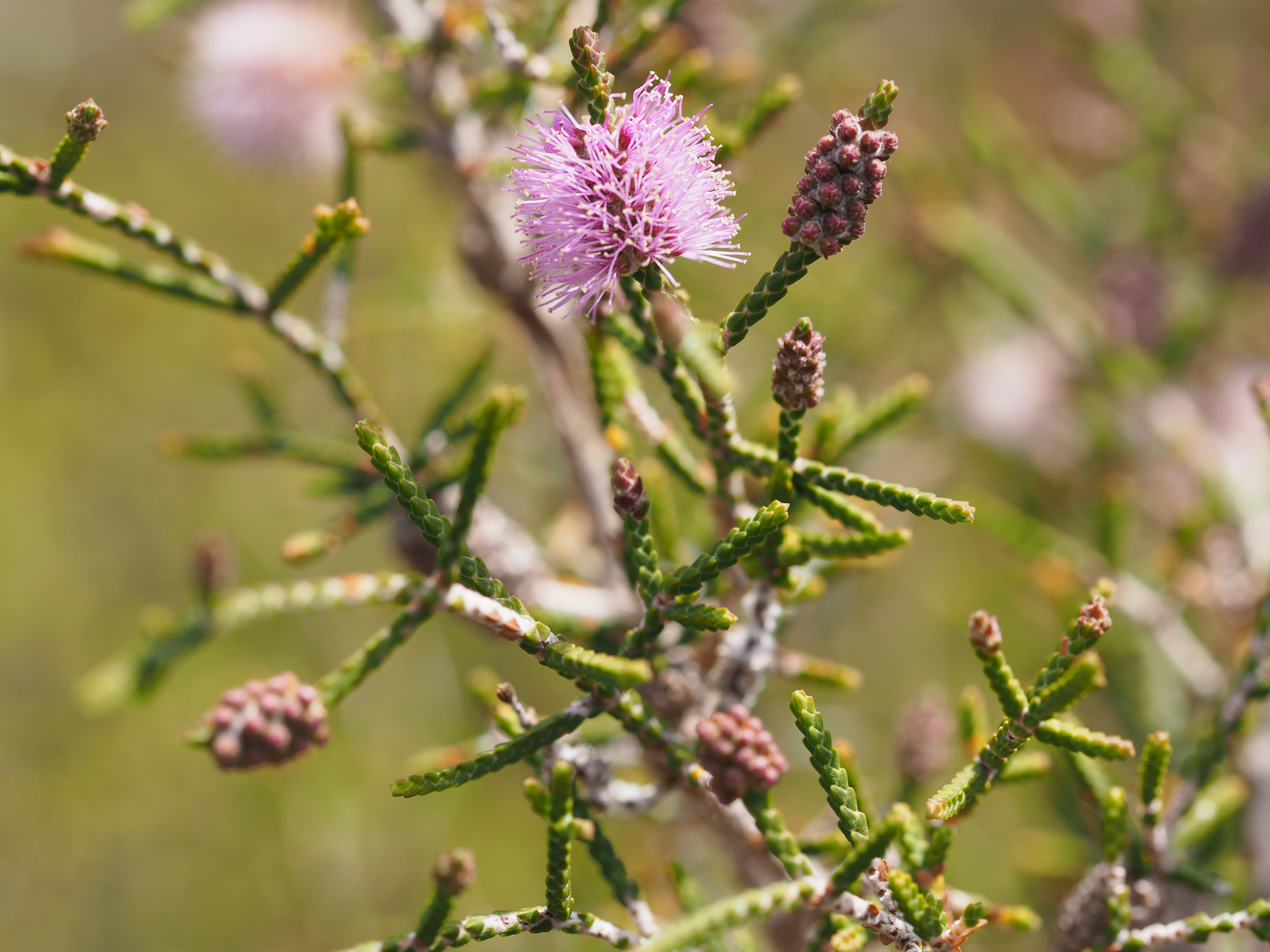
- Beaufortia micrantha leaves and flowers

Scientific classification
- Kingdom: Plantae
- Clade: Tracheophytes
- Clade: Angiosperms
- Clade: Eudicots
- Clade: Rosids
- Order: Myrtales
- Family: Myrtaceae
- Genus: Beaufortia
- Species: B. micrantha

Binomial name
- Beaufortia micrantha Schauer

Synonyms
- Melaleuca micrantha (Schauer) Craven & R.D.Edwards; Melaleuca micrantha (Schauer) Craven & R.D.Edwards var. micrantha; Regelia adpressa Turcz.

= Beaufortia micrantha =

Small-leaved beaufortia

Species of flowering plant

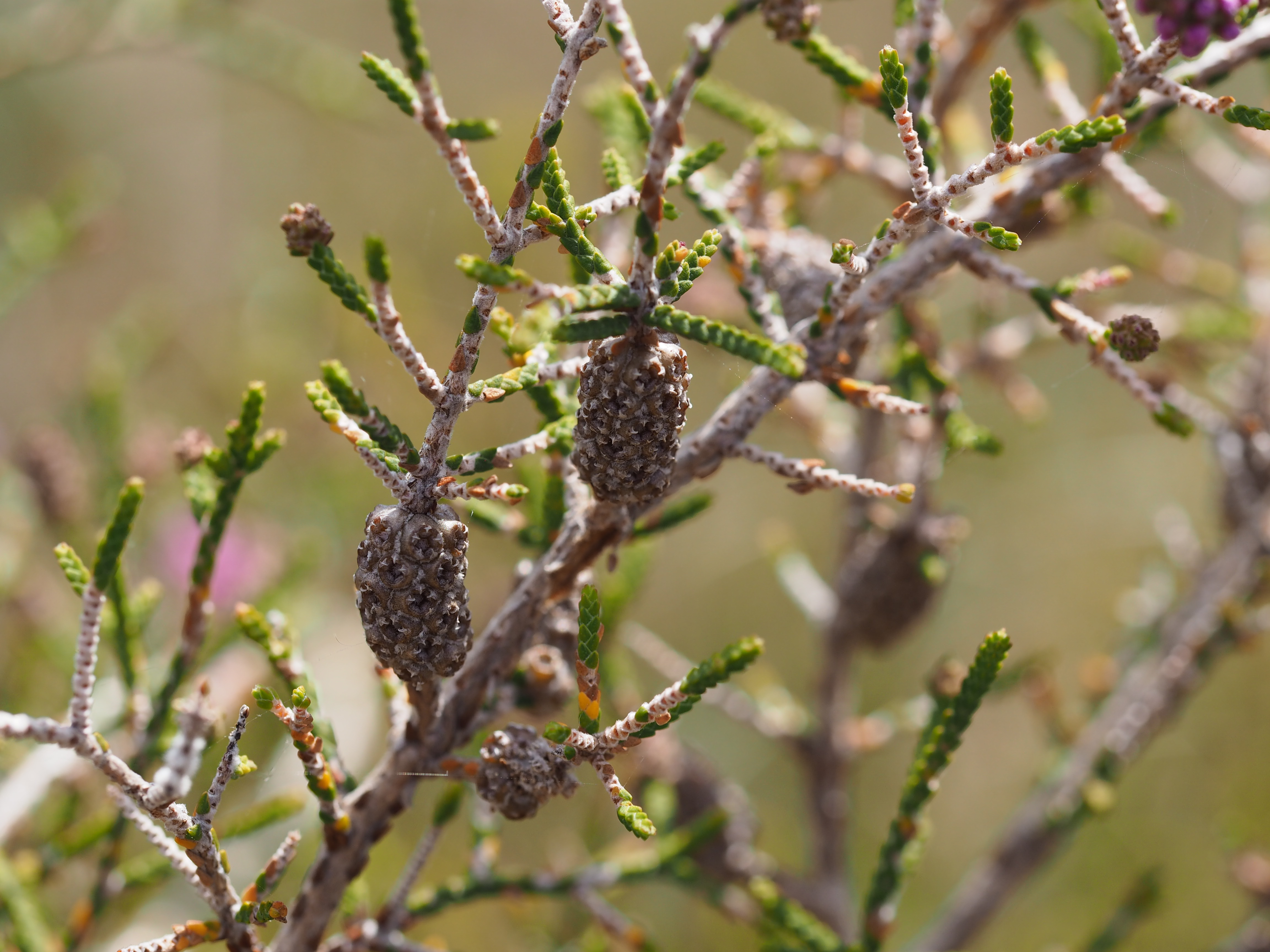
Leaves and fruits

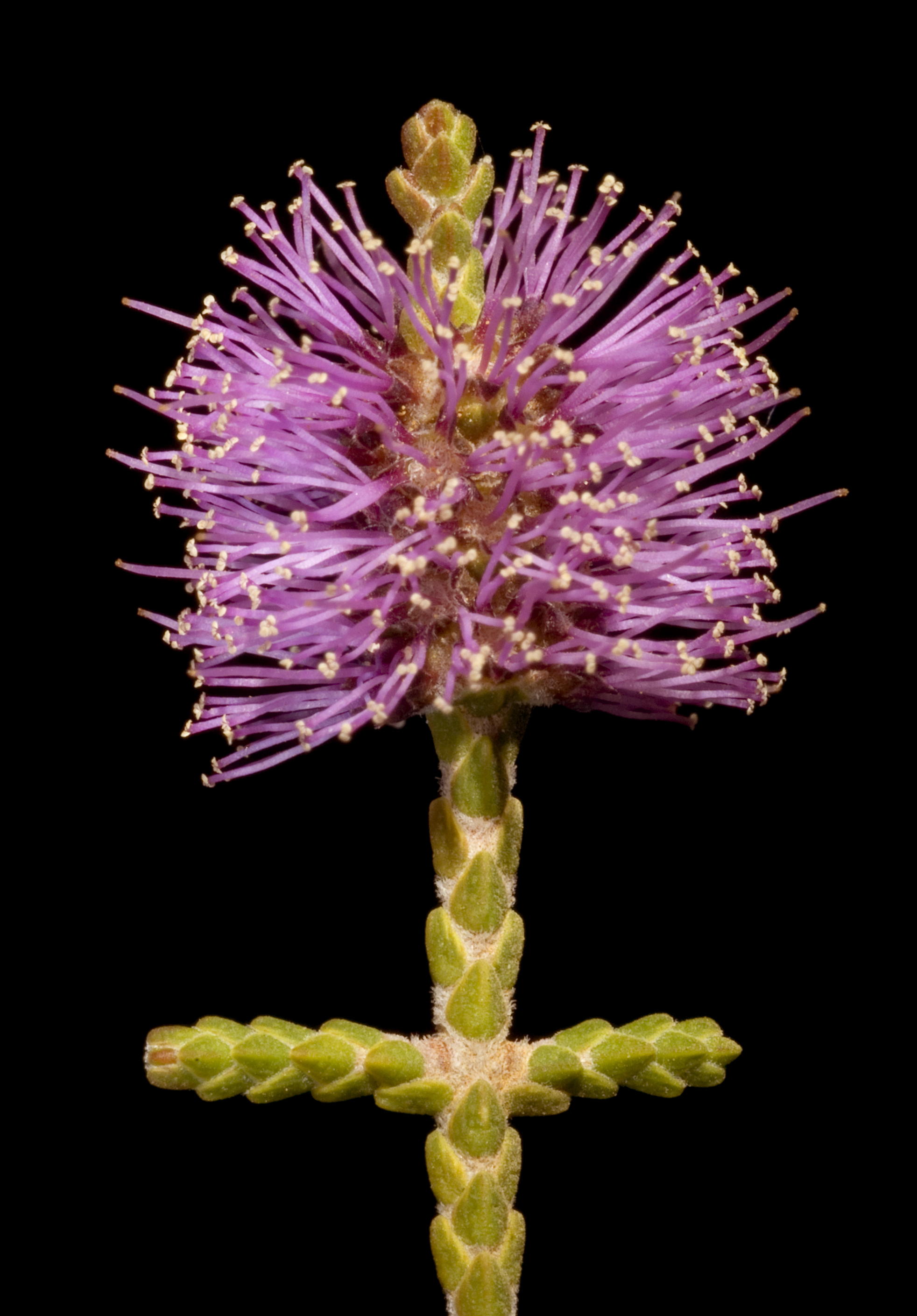
Beaufortia micrantha

Beaufortia micrantha, commonly known as small-leaved beaufortia or little bottlebrush, is a species of flowering plant in the myrtle family, Myrtaceae and is endemic to the southwest of Western Australia. It is a compact shrub with tiny leaves pressed against the stems and profuse heads of purple or pinkish-coloured flowers.

== Description ==
Beaufortia micrantha is a small, compact shrub which grows to a height of about 0.5 metres (2 ft). The leaves are triangular in shape with the end tapering to a point, 1–2 millimetres (0.04–0.08 in) long and have their upper surfaces pressed against the stems, sometimes overlapping each other. The leaves of Beaufortia empetrifolia are similar in size and shape but are not pressed against the stems to the same extent.

The flowers are usually pinkish-red to purple and are arranged in heads about 10 millimetres (0.4 in) in diameter, 15 millimetres (0.6 in) long on the ends of branches which continue to grow after flowering. The flowers have 5 sepals, 5 petals and 5 bundles of stamens. The stamen bundles have 3 to 5 stamens each, are 6–10 millimetres (0.2–0.4 in) long with the free parts a further 5–10 millimetres (0.2–0.4 in) long. Flowering occurs in most months but mainly from September to November and is followed by fruits which are woody capsules 25–35 millimetres (0.98–1.4 in) long, 6–10 millimetres (0.2–0.4 in) wide and closely packed together.

== Taxonomy and naming ==
Beaufortia micrantha was first formally described in 1843 by Johannes Conrad Schauer in Dissertatio phytographica de Regelia, Beaufortia et Calothamno. The specific epithet (micrantha) is derived from the Ancient Greek μικρός (mikrós) meaning "small" and ἄνθος (ánthos) meaning "flower".

== Distribution and habitat ==
Beaufortia micrantha mainly occurs in and between the Esperance, Albany, Corrigin and Southern Cross districts in the Avon Wheatbelt, Coolgardie, Esperance Plains, Jarrah Forest and Mallee bioregions of south-western Western Australia. It usually grows in sandy soils derived from laterite on plains and ridges.

== Conservation ==
Beaufortia micrantha is classified as "not threatened" by the Western Australian Government Department of Biodiversity, Conservation and Attractions.
