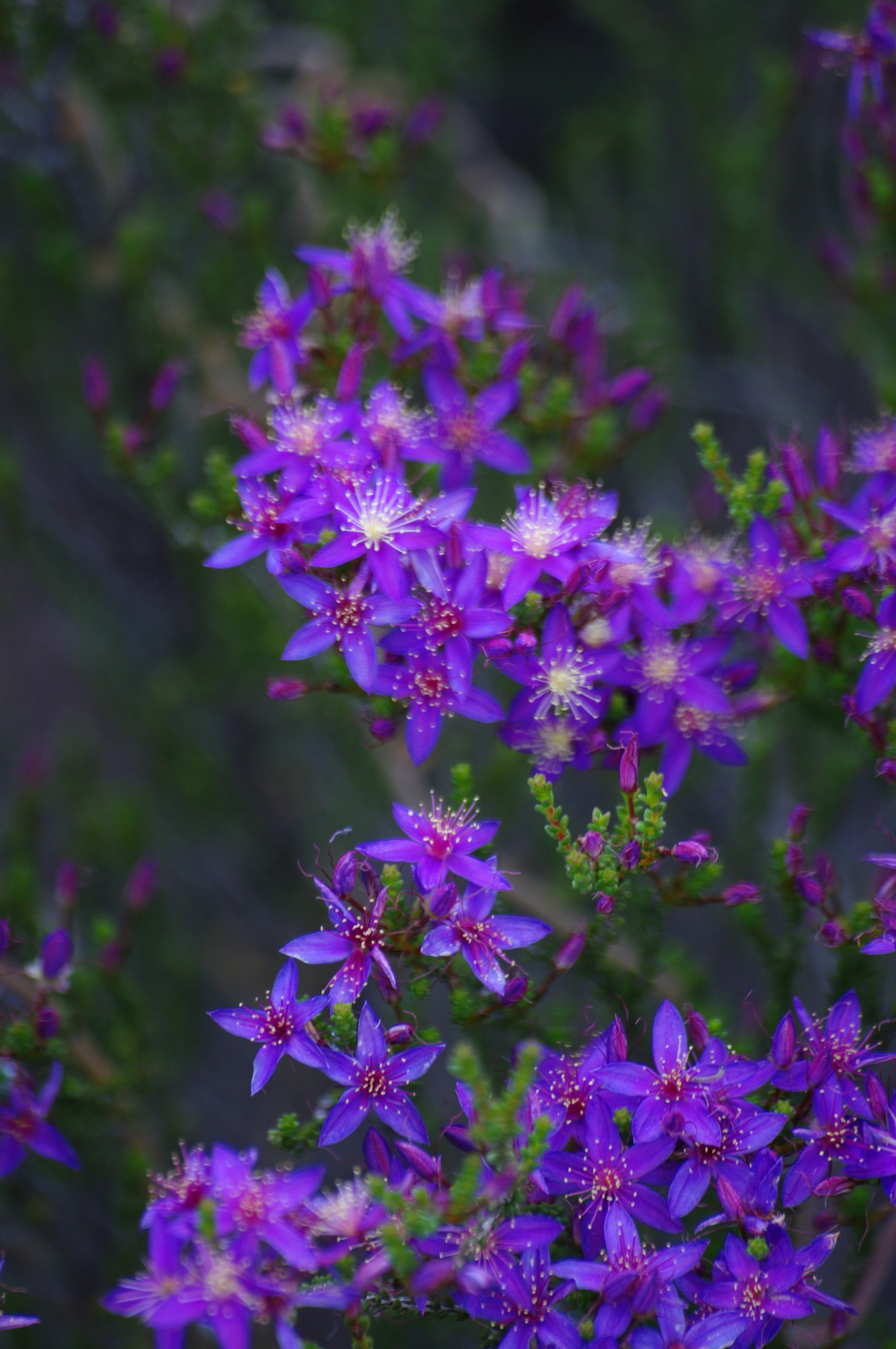

Scientific classification
- Kingdom: Plantae
- Clade: Tracheophytes
- Clade: Angiosperms
- Clade: Eudicots
- Clade: Rosids
- Order: Myrtales
- Family: Myrtaceae
- Genus: Calytrix
- Species: C. leschenaultii

Binomial name
- Calytrix leschenaultii (Schauer) Benth.

Synonyms
- Calycothrix leschenaultii Schauer; Calythrix leschenaulti Benth. orth. var.

= Calytrix leschenaultii =

Species of flowering plant

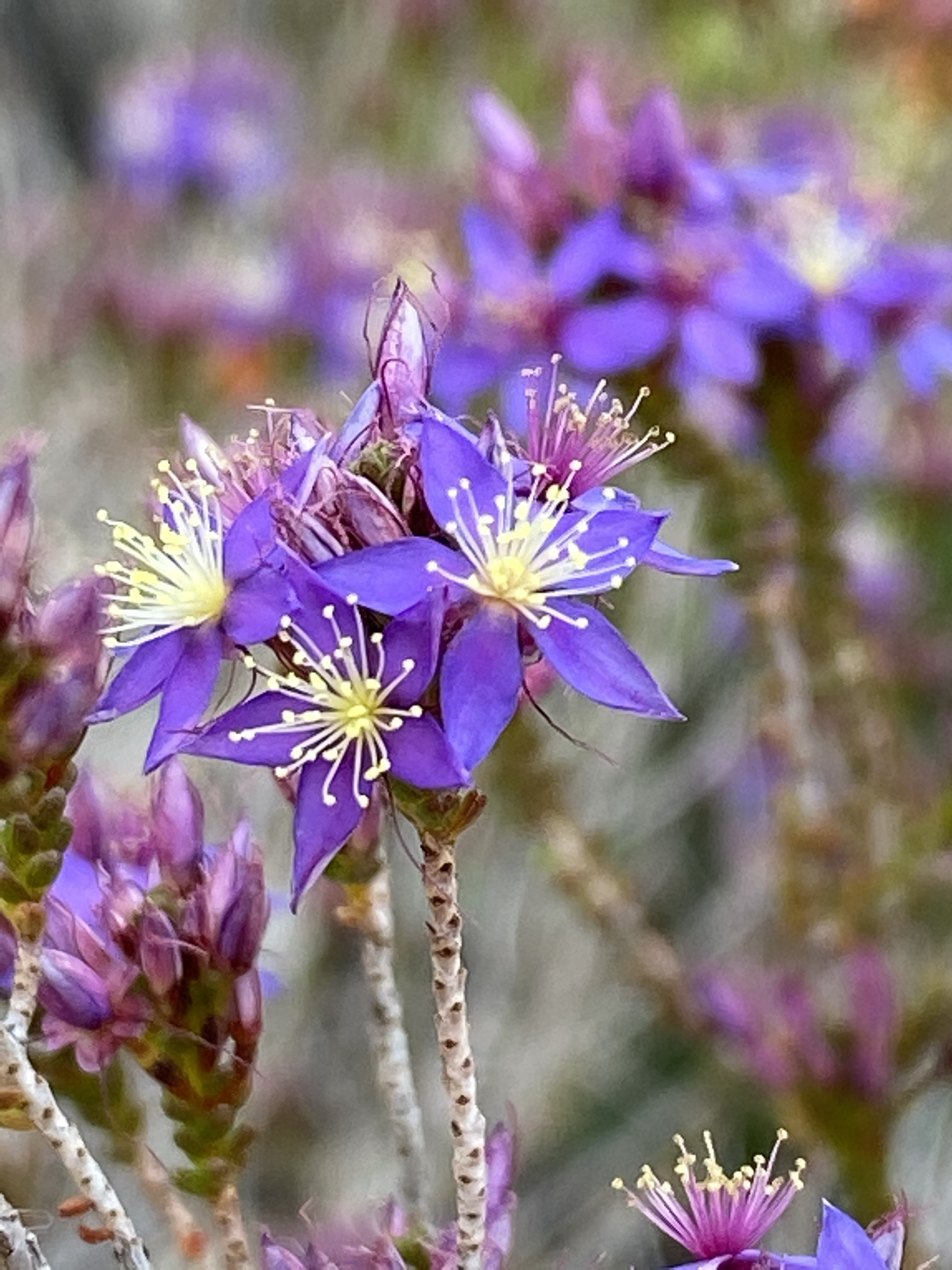
Flower detail

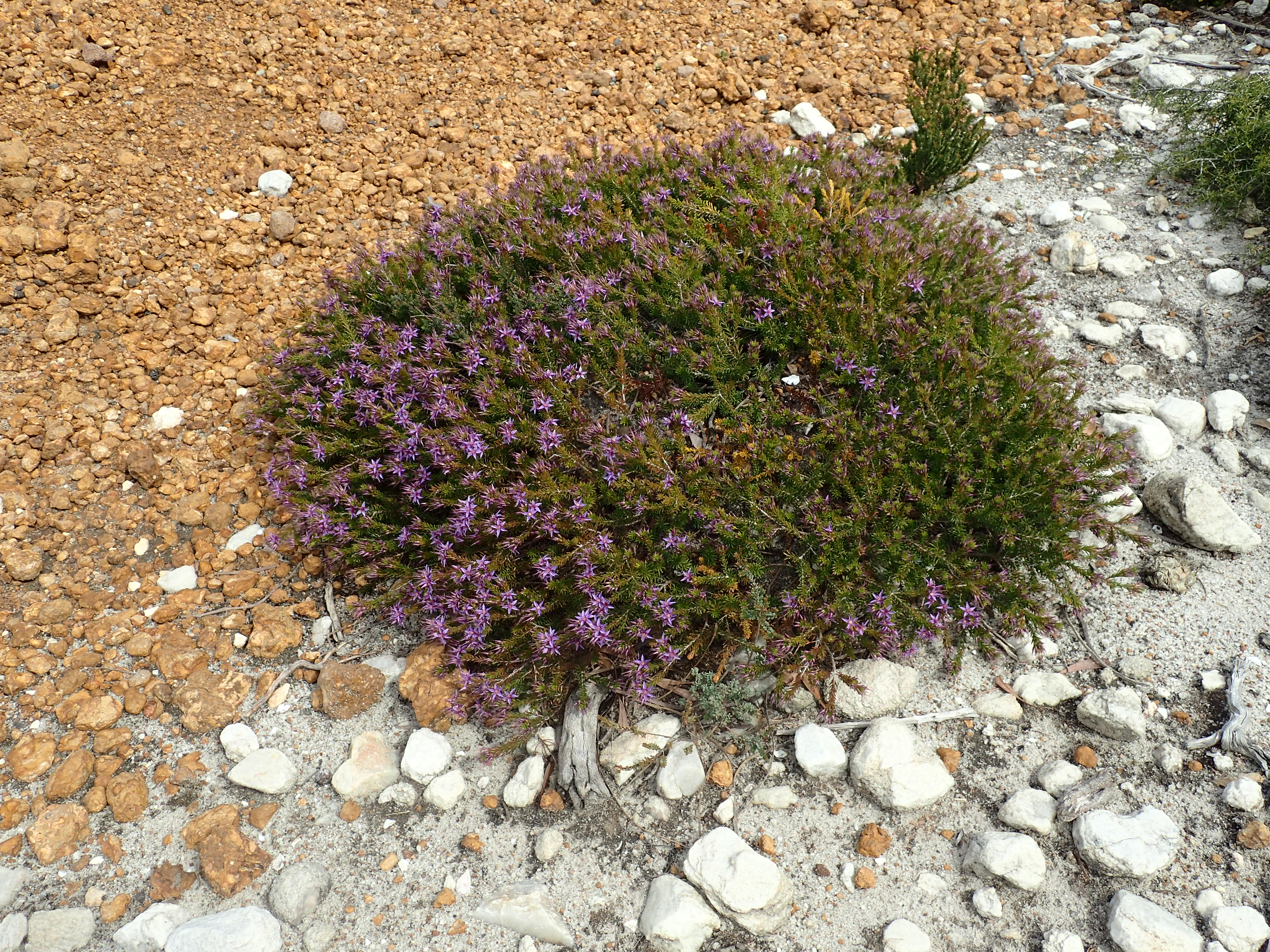
Habit in the Fitzgerald River National Park

Calytrix leschenaultii is a species of flowering plant in the myrtle family Myrtaceae and is endemic to the Southwest Australia of Western Australia. It is a mostly glabrous shrub with egg-shaped, elliptic, lance-shaped or linear leaves and purple, mauve, violet or pink flowers with a white or yellow base, and 6 to 40 white or yellowish stamens.

== Description ==
Calytrix leschenaultii is a mostly glabrous shrub that typically grows to a height of 0.15–1 m (5.9 in – 3 ft 3.4 in). Its leaves are egg-shaped, elliptic, lance-shaped or linear, 1–4 mm (0.039–0.157 in) long and 0.5–1.6 mm (0.020–0.063 in) wide on a petiole 0.1–0.5 mm (0.0039–0.0197 in) long. There are no stipules. The flowers are on a funnel-shaped peduncle 0.6–2.5 mm (0.024–0.098 in) long with narrowly elliptic to spoon shaped bracteoles 3.75–7.0 mm (0.148–0.276 in) long with egg-shaped to more or less round lobes, 1.5–2.9 mm (0.059–0.114 in) long. The floral tube has 10 ribs and is fused to the style, 5.75–11 mm (0.226–0.433 in) long. The sepals are broadly egg-shaped 1.00–1.75 mm (0.039–0.069 in) long and 1.3–2.25 mm (0.051–0.089 in) long with an awn up to 10 mm (0.39 in) long. The petals are purple, mauve violet or pink with a white or yellowish base, lance-shaped to elliptic, 4.5–7.5 mm (0.18–0.30 in) long and 2.0–3.75 mm (0.079–0.148 in) wide, and there are 6 to 40 white or yellowish stamens. Flowering mainly occurs from June to November with a peak in September and October.

== Taxonomy ==
Calytrix leschenaultii was first formally described in 1844 by Johannes Conrad Schauer who gave it the name Calycothrix leschenaultii in Lehmann's Plantae Preissianae. In 1867 George Bentham transferred the species to the genus Calytrix as C. leschenaultii. The specific epithet (leschenaultii) honours Jean-Baptiste Leschenault de La Tour.

== Distribution and habitat ==
Calytrix leschenaultii occurs in a wide range of habitats including heath, woodland, heathy scrub and shrubland from the Kalbarri district and south-eastwards as far as Israelite Bay in the Avon Wheatbelt, Coolgardie, Esperance Plains, Geraldton Sandplains, Jarrah Forest, Mallee, Swan Coastal Plain, Warren and Yalgoo bioregions of south-western Western Australia.

== Conservation status ==
This species of Calytrix is listed as "not threatened" by the Government of Western Australia Department of Biodiversity, Conservation and Attractions.

== Use in horticulture ==
Outside the flowering season, this plant is rather plain. The slightly scented, small oval leaves line the spindly shoots in an alternate arrangement, in the same way as many others in the myrtle family. The plant comes into its own when in full bloom. The star-like flowers themselves are a vivid purple with white or yellow stamens (fading to red). Although rarely seen in cultivation, Calytrix leschenaultii is well able to deal with the extremes of the Australian climate. Given a sunny spot in sandy soil, it can cope with both drought and frost. It is best propagated from cuttings rather than seed.
