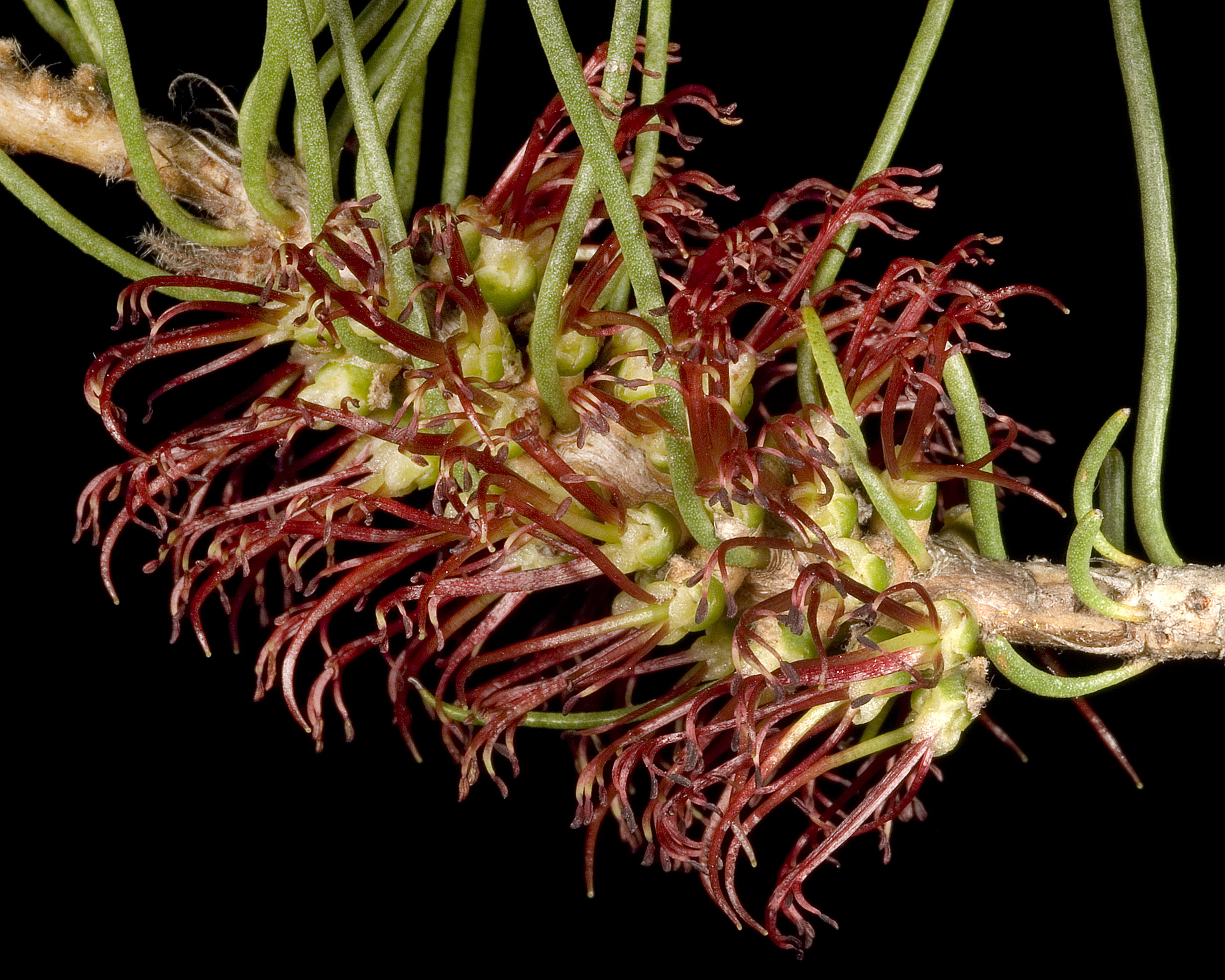

Scientific classification
- Kingdom: Plantae
- Clade: Tracheophytes
- Clade: Angiosperms
- Clade: Eudicots
- Clade: Rosids
- Order: Myrtales
- Family: Myrtaceae
- Genus: Calothamnus
- Species: C. preissii

Binomial name
- Calothamnus preissii Schauer

Synonyms
- Calothamnus laxa Kunze orth. var.; Calothamnus laxus Kunze; Melaleuca preissii (Schauer) Craven & R.D.Edwards

= Calothamnus preissii =

Species of flowering plant

Calothamnus preissii is a plant in the myrtle family, Myrtaceae and is endemic to the south-west of Western Australia. It is a low-lying, sometimes ground-hugging shrub with needle-like leaves and reddish-purple flowers in spring.

== Description ==
Calothamnus preissii is a prostrate shrub growing to a height of about 0.4 metres (1.3 ft) with linear leaves that are circular in cross-section. The flowers are reddish purple and have 4 sepals, 4 petals and 4 claw-like bundles of stamens. The bundles are all narrow but the upper ones are larger and contain 3 to 5 stamens but the lower two have only 1 or 2 stamens. Flowering occurs from July to November and is followed by fruits that are woody capsules.

== Taxonomy and naming ==
Calothamnus preissii was first formally described by Johannes Schauer in 1843 in Dissertatio phytographica de Regelia, Beaufortia et Calothamno. The specific epithet (preissii) honours the German-born British botanist, Ludwig Preiss.

In 2014 Craven, Edwards and Cowley proposed that the species be renamed Melaleuca preissii but the name is not accepted by the Australian Plant Census.

== Distribution and habitat ==
Calothamnus preissii occurs in and between the Tutanning Nature Reserve near Pingelly, the Cranbrook district and Frankland in the Esperance Plains and Jarrah Forest biogeographic regions where it grows in gravelly sand or clay on hillsides.

== Conservation status ==
Calothamnus preissii is classified as "not threatened" by the Western Australian Government Department of Parks and Wildlife.
