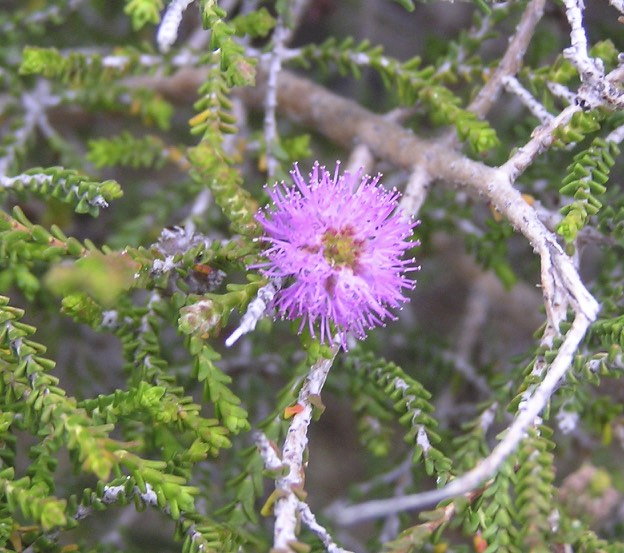
- Foliage and flowers of Beaufortia empetrifolia

Scientific classification
- Kingdom: Plantae
- Clade: Tracheophytes
- Clade: Angiosperms
- Clade: Eudicots
- Clade: Rosids
- Order: Myrtales
- Family: Myrtaceae
- Genus: Beaufortia
- Species: B. empetrifolia

Binomial name
- Beaufortia empetrifolia (Rchb.) Schauer

Synonyms
- Beaufortia elegans var. minor Benth.; Beaufortia micrantha var. empetrifolia (Rchb.) Benth.; Beaufortia microphylla Turcz.; Melaleuca empetrifolia Rchb.

= Beaufortia empetrifolia =

South coast beaufortia

Species of flowering plant

Beaufortia empetrifolia, commonly known as south coast beaufortia, is a plant in the myrtle family, Myrtaceae and is endemic to the southwest of Western Australia. It is a highly branched shrub with small, crowded leaves and pinkish to purple flowers in small, bottlebrush-like spikes in the warmer months. It is similar to Beaufortia micrantha except that its leaves are slightly larger.

== Description ==
Beaufortia empetrifolia is a compact, much branched shrub which grows to a height of 2 m (7 ft). The leaves are arranged in opposite pairs (decussate) so they make four rows along the stems. The leaves are egg-shaped, 1.5–3 mm (0.06–0.1 in) long and 0.5–2 mm (0.02–0.08 in) wide.

The flowers are pink to purplish red and are arranged in heads about 20 mm (0.8 in) in diameter, on the ends of branches which continue to grow after flowering. The flowers have 5 sepals, 5 petals and 5 bundles of stamens with usually three to five stamens each. The stamens bundles are hairy and joined for 1.5–5 mm (0.06–0.2 in) of their length with the free parts a further 2.5–5 mm (0.1–0.2 in) long. Flowering can occur in almost any month, depending on the weather and is followed by fruits which are woody capsules. The capsules are 6.5–11.5 mm (0.3–0.5 in) long and 5–6 mm (0.20–0.24 in) wide and often joined together.

== Taxonomy and naming ==
Melaleuca empetrifolia was first formally described in 1828 by the German botanist, Ludwig Reichenbach in Iconographia Botanica Exotica. In 1843, Johannes Schauer recognised it as Beaufortia empetrifolia. Lyndley Craven proposes combining Beaufortia and several other related genera with Melaleuca, in which case, Reichenbach's original name would be restored.

== Distribution and habitat ==
Beaufortia empetrifolia mainly occurs in and between the Albany and Esperance districts in the Esperance Plains, Hampton, Jarrah Forest and Mallee bioregions of south-western Western Australia. It usually grows in sand, often near granite outcrops.

== Conservation ==
Beaufortia empetrifolia is classified as "not threatened" by the Western Australian Government Department of Biodiversity, Conservation and Attractions.
