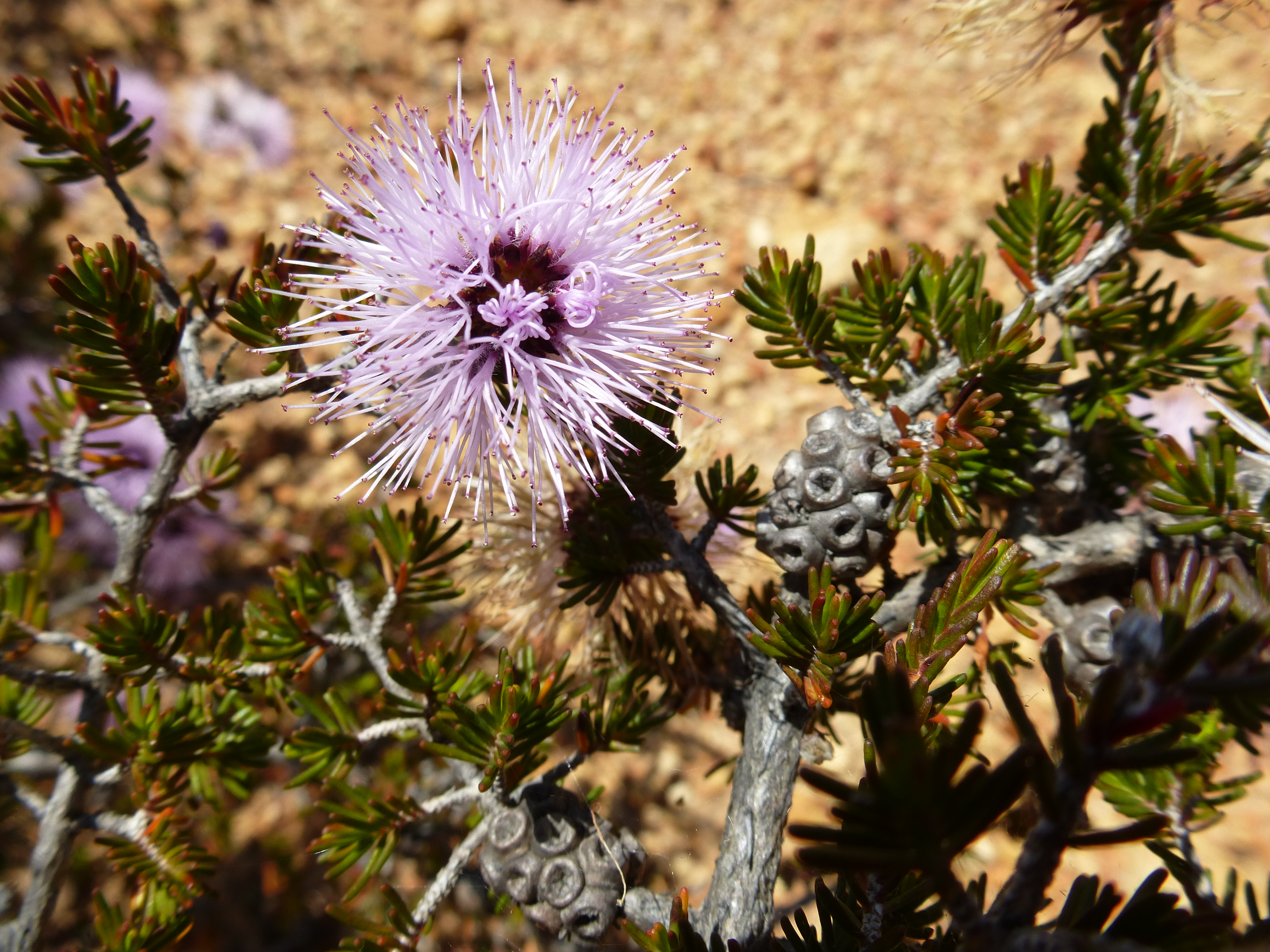

Scientific classification
- Kingdom: Plantae
- Clade: Tracheophytes
- Clade: Angiosperms
- Clade: Eudicots
- Clade: Rosids
- Order: Myrtales
- Family: Myrtaceae
- Genus: Beaufortia
- Species: B. schaueri

Binomial name
- Beaufortia schaueri Schauer

Synonyms
- Beaufortia schaueri var. atrorubens Benth.; Beaufortia schaueri Preiss ex Schauer var. schaueri; Melaleuca jonesii Craven & R.D.Edwards

= Beaufortia schaueri =

Pink bottlebrush

Species of flowering plant

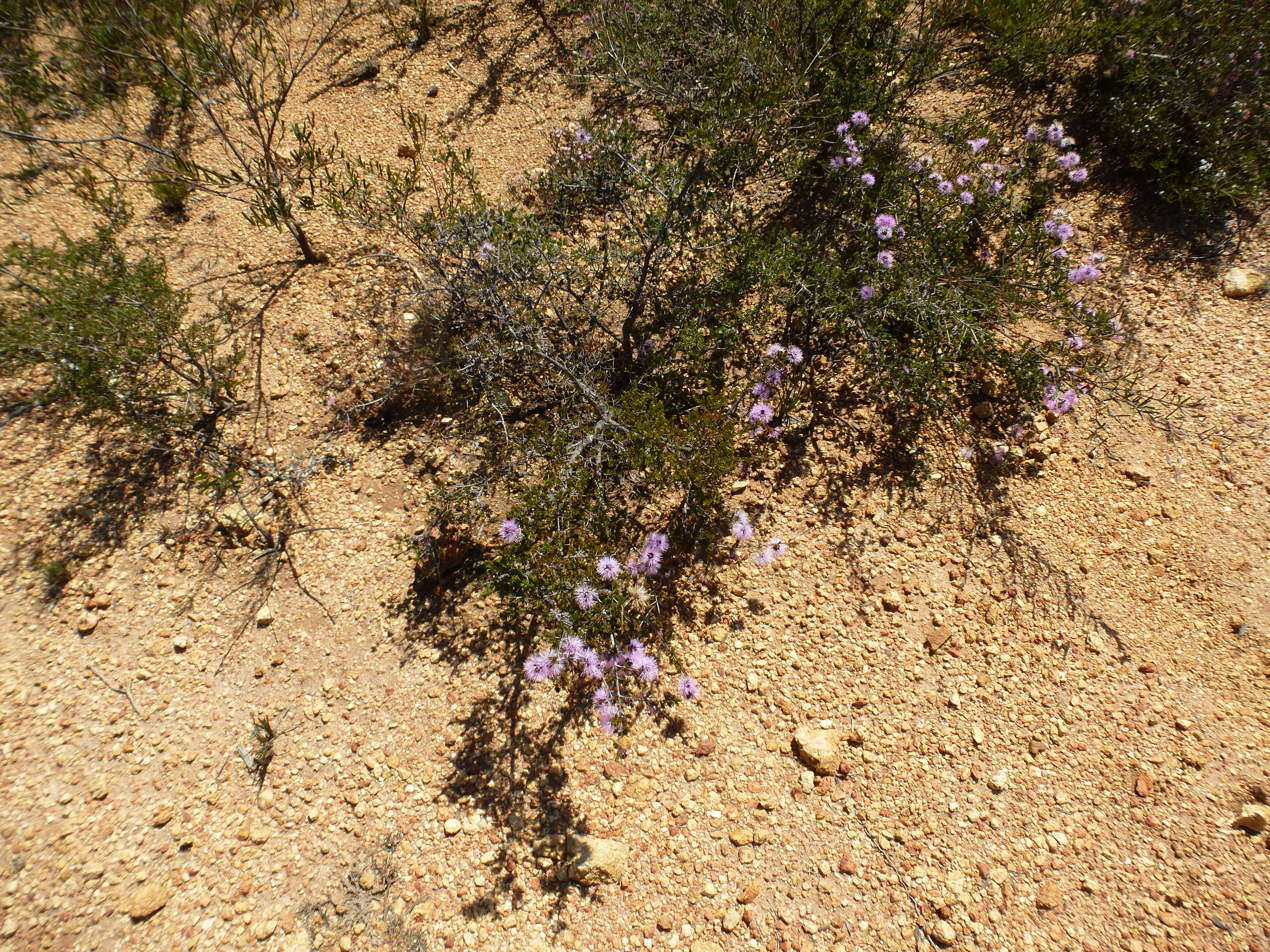
Habit near Ravensthorpe

Beaufortia schaueri, commonly known as pink bottlebrush or pink beaufortia, is a species of flowering plant in the myrtle family, Myrtaceae and is endemic to the southwest of Western Australia. It is a small, rounded shrub with small, crowded, linear leaves and profuse, spherical heads of pink flowers conspicuously displayed on the ends of the branches in spring.

== Description ==
Beaufortia schaueri is a small, compact shrub which grows to a height of about 1.5 metres (5 ft). The leaves are arranged in alternating pairs (decussate) so that they make four rows along the stems. The leaves are about 10 millimetres (0.4 in) long, linear in shape, overlap each other and are triangular to almost circular in cross section.

The flowers are bright pink to mauve and are arranged in almost spherical heads on the ends of branches which continue to grow after flowering. The flowers have 5 sepals, 5 petals and 5 bundles of stamens. There are usually 5 stamens in a bundle and they are joined for about half their length. Flowering occurs from September to December and is followed by fruits which are woody capsules.

== Taxonomy ==
Beaufortia schaueri was first formally described in 1843 by Johannes Conrad Schauer in Dissertatio phytographica de Regelia, Beaufortia et Calothamno from an unpublished description by Balthazar Preiss. The specific epithet (schaueri) honours Schauer.

== Distribution and habitat ==
Beaufortia schaueri occurs mainly between the Albany and Israelite Bay districts in the Avon Wheatbelt, Coolgardie, Esperance Plains, Jarrah Forest and Mallee bioregions of south-western Western Australia. It usually grows in sandy soils or those derived from laterite on plains and slopes.

== Conservation ==
Beaufortia schaueri is classified as "not threatened" by the Western Australian government Department of Parks and Wildlife.
