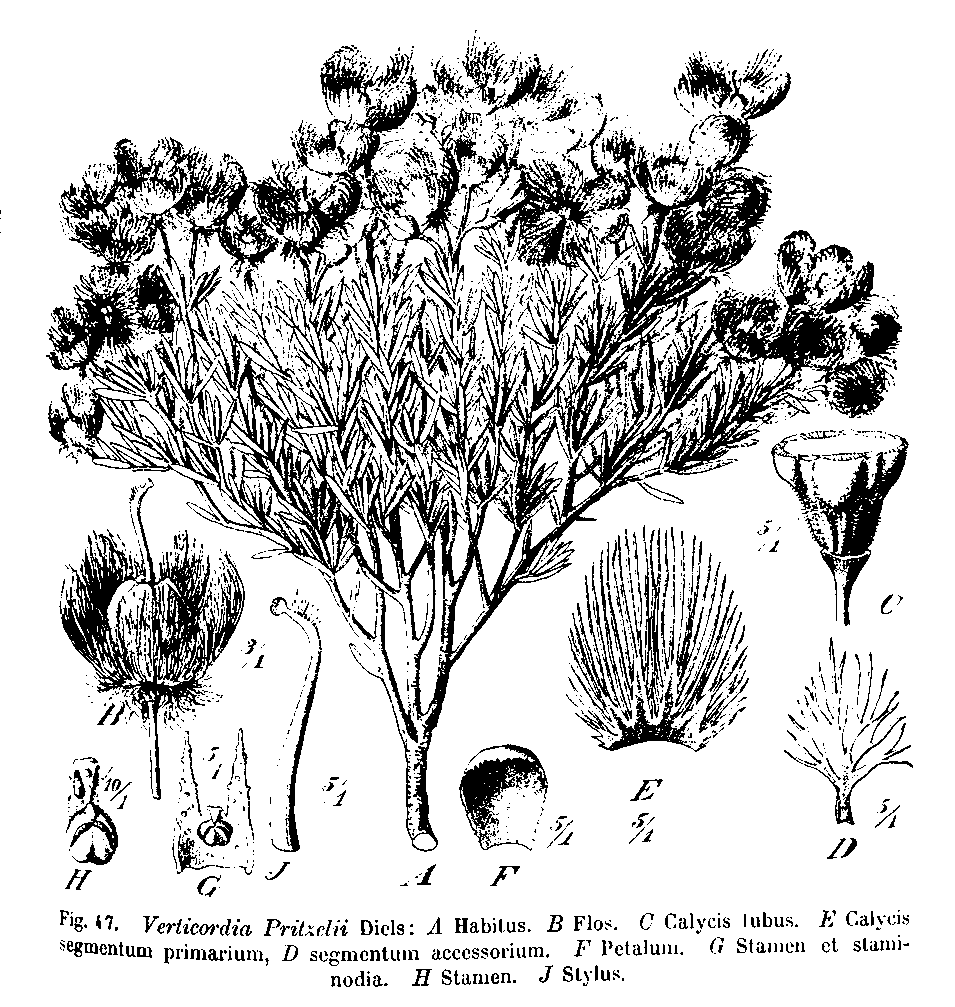
- Illustration from the species first description

Scientific classification
- Kingdom: Plantae
- Clade: Tracheophytes
- Clade: Angiosperms
- Clade: Eudicots
- Clade: Rosids
- Order: Myrtales
- Family: Myrtaceae
- Genus: Verticordia
- Subgenus: Verticordia subg. Verticordia
- Section: Verticordia sect. Catocalypta
- Species: V. pritzelii

Binomial name
- Verticordia pritzelii Diels

= Verticordia pritzelii =

Pritzel's featherflower

Species of flowering plant

Verticordia pritzelii, commonly known as Pritzel's featherflower, is a species of flowering plant in the myrtle family, Myrtaceae and is endemic to the south-west of Western Australia. It is a compact, woody shrub with several main stems, small, linear to club-shaped leaves, and rounded groups of deep pink flowers from late spring to mid-summer.

== Description ==
Verticordia pritzelii is a shrub which grows to a height of 15–90 cm (6–40 in) and 15–70 cm (6–30 in) with several stems at its base. The leaves are linear to club-shaped, semi-circular in cross-section, 2–8 mm (0.08–0.3 in) long with a small point on the end.

The flowers are scented and arranged in rounded groups, each flower on a stalk 5–6 mm (0.20–0.24 in) long. The floral cup is hemispherical in shape, about 1.5 mm (0.06 in) long and there is a swelling beneath each sepal. The sepals are spreading, deep pink but fade to white as they age. They are 4.5–6 mm (0.18–0.24 in) long, have 4-6 long, long, thin lobes and two hairy appendages. The petals are a similar colour to the sepals, 2.5 mm (0.1 in) long, erect and more or less round with small teeth on their outer edge. The style is 5–5.5 mm (0.20–0.22 in) long, with hairs near the tip. Flowering time is from October to early January.

The deep colouration of the flowers of V. pritzelii and its compact habit distinguish it from other members of section Catocalypta.

== Taxonomy and naming ==
Verticordia pritzleii was first formally described by Ludwig Diels in 1904 from a specimen collected near Coolgardie. The description was published in Fragmenta Phytographiae Australiae occidentalis. The specific epithet (pritzelii) honours Ernst Georg Pritzel who visited Diels in 1900.

When Alex George reviewed the genus Verticordia in 1991, he placed this species in subgenus Verticordia, section Catocalypta along with V. inclusa, V. apecta, V. insignis, V. habrantha, V. lehmannii and V. roei.

== Distribution and habitat ==
Pritzel's featherflower is found in yellow or white to grey sand, on undulating plains between Perenjori, Bungalbin and Forrestania in the Avon Wheatbelt, Coolgardie, Mallee, Murchison and Swan Coastal Plain biogeographic regions.

== Conservation ==
Verticordia pritzelii is classified as "not threatened" by the Western Australian Government Department of Parks and Wildlife.

== Use in horticulture ==
This species shows potential as a garden plant and is relatively easy to propagate, however, it has proven difficult to maintain in the garden although previously grown successfully in Kings Park Botanical Garden.
