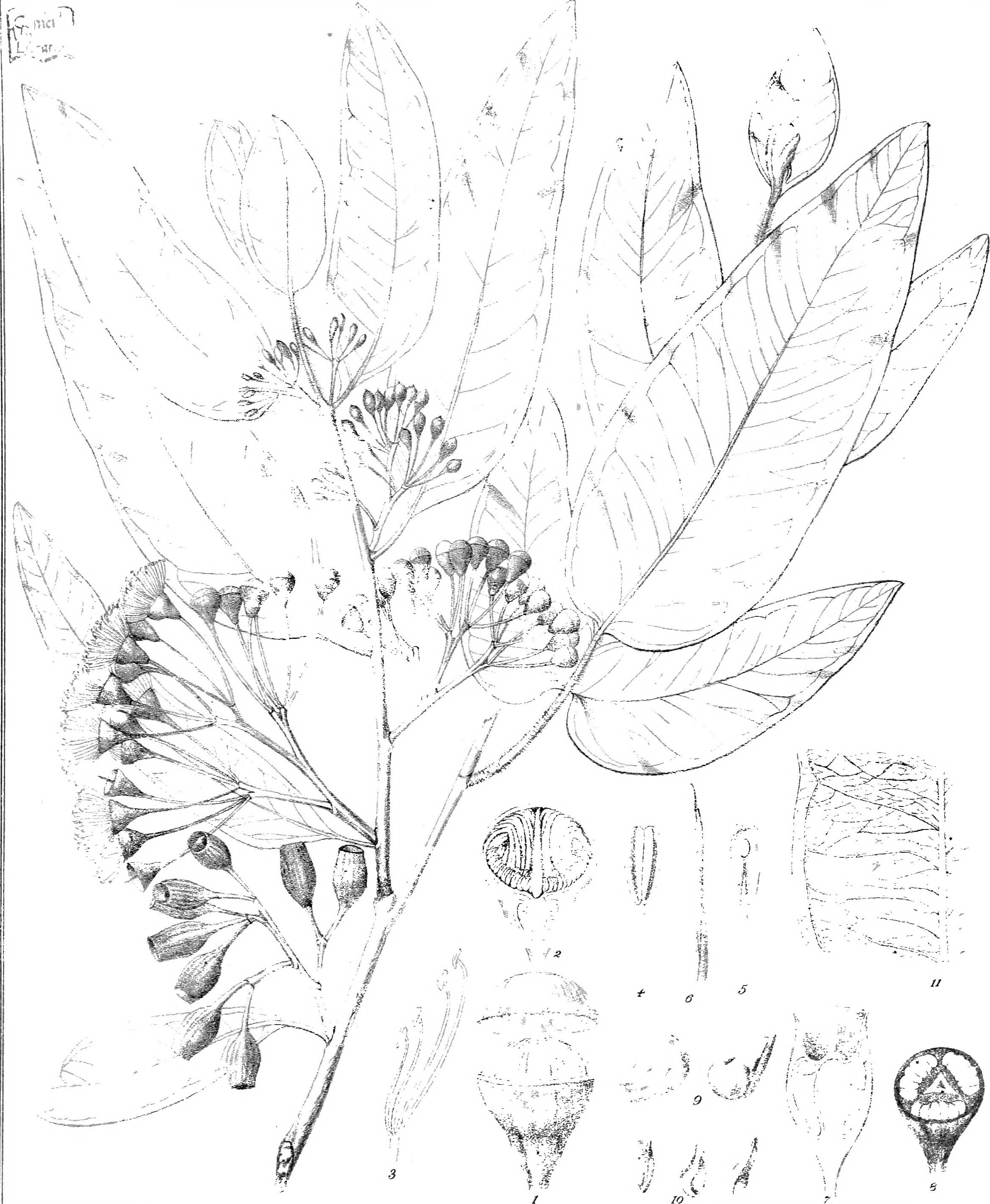
- Illustration from Ferdinand von Mueller's Eucalyptographia

Scientific classification
- Kingdom: Plantae
- Clade: Tracheophytes
- Clade: Angiosperms
- Clade: Eudicots
- Clade: Rosids
- Order: Myrtales
- Family: Myrtaceae
- Genus: Corymbia
- Species: C. clavigera

Binomial name
- Corymbia clavigera (A.Cunn. ex Schauer) K.D.Hill & L.A.S.Johnson

Synonyms
- Eucalyptus clavigera A.Cunn. ex Schauer; Eucalyptus clavigera A.Cunn. ex Schauer var. clavigera

= Corymbia clavigera =

Apple gum

Species of plant

Corymbia clavigera, commonly known as apple gum or cabbage gum, is a species of tree that is endemic to a small area in the north-west Kimberley region of Western Australia. It has smooth, pale grey and white bark, lance-shaped or elliptical adult leaves, flower buds in groups of three or seven, white flowers and urn-shaped to barrel-shaped fruit.

== Description ==
Corymbia clavigera is a tree that typically grows to a height of 5 to 15 metres (16 to 49 ft) and forms a lignotuber. It has smooth white to pale grey over nearly all of the trunk, sometimes with a partially thin, rough and irregularly flaky-tessellated at the base of the trunk. The adult leaves are arranged alternately, the same shade of dull green on both sides, lance-shaped or elliptical, 70–160 mm (2.8–6.3 in) long and 14–25 mm (0.55–0.98 in) wide with a pointed apex and the base tapering to a petiole 10–22 mm (0.39–0.87 in) long. The flower buds are arranged in leaf axils on a branched peduncle up to 14 mm (0.55 in) long, each branch of the peduncle with three or seven buds on pedicels 8–17 mm (0.31–0.67 in) long. Mature buds are oval to pear-shaped, about 7 mm (0.28 in) long and 4 mm (0.16 in) wide with a rounded operculum. Flowering occurs from September to October and the flower are white. The fruit is an urn-shaped or barrel-shaped capsule 7–9 mm (0.28–0.35 in) long and 9–14 mm (0.35–0.55 in) wide on a pedicel 9–17 mm (0.35–0.67 in) long with a descending disc and three valves enclosed in the fruit.

== Taxonomy ==
The species was first formally described in 1843 by the botanist Johannes Conrad Schauer as Eucalyptus clavigera from an unpublished description by Allan Cunningham. Schauer's description was published in Wilhelm Gerhard Walpers book Repertorium Botanices Systematicae. Cunningham collected the type specimens in 1820 at Careening Bay and Port Nelson during the voyage of HMS Mermaid and it was collected there again in 1984 by Kevin Kenneally in an area he described as "on basalt slope behind the beach". It was reclassified as Corymbia watsoniana in 1995 by Kenneth Hill and Lawrence Alexander Sidney Johnson in the journal Telopea.

== Distribution and habitat ==
Corymbia clavigera is only known with certainty from the type location in coastal areas of the Kimberley region of Western Australia. It is also likely to be growing on nearby off-shore islands and in areas of the Carson River volcanics between Port Warrender and the Mitchell Plateau.

== Conservation status ==
This eucalypt is classified as "not threatened" by the Western Australian Government Department of Parks and Wildlife.

== See also ==
- List of Corymbia species
