= Verticordia insignis subsp. eomagis =

Conservation status
- Priority Three — Poorly Known Taxa (DEC)

Scientific classification
- Kingdom: Plantae
- Clade: Tracheophytes
- Clade: Angiosperms
- Clade: Eudicots
- Clade: Rosids
- Order: Myrtales
- Family: Myrtaceae
- Genus: Verticordia
- Species: V. insignis
- Subspecies: V. i. subsp. eomagis

Trinomial name
- Verticordia insignis subsp. eomagis A.S.George

Subspecies of shrub

Verticordia insignis subsp. eomagis is a woody shrub, with white and pink flowers, found in Southwest Australia.

They are known to occur in several populations between Perth and Geraldton, but have been insufficiently studied with regard to threat of extinction. No immediate threat is known, but they are listed as Priority Three on the Declared Rare and Priority Flora List for Western Australia as requiring urgent assessment of their rarity.
