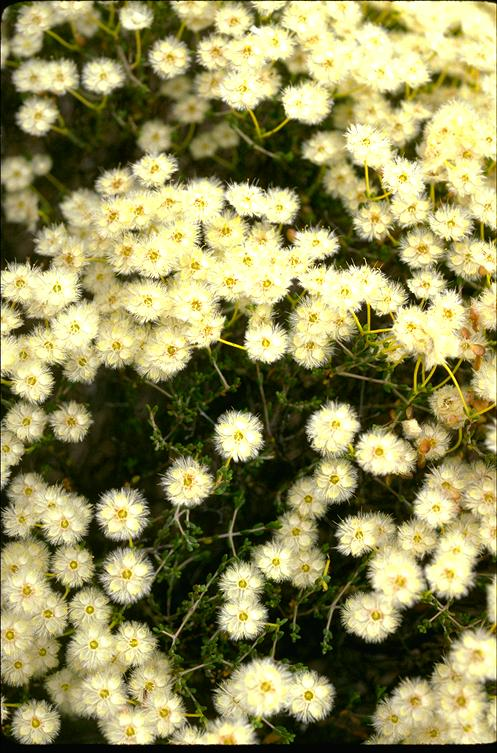
- Verticordia roei subsp. roei

Scientific classification
- Kingdom: Plantae
- Clade: Tracheophytes
- Clade: Angiosperms
- Clade: Eudicots
- Clade: Rosids
- Order: Myrtales
- Family: Myrtaceae
- Genus: Verticordia
- Subgenus: Verticordia subg. Verticordia
- Section: Verticordia sect. Catocalypta
- Species: V. roei

Binomial name
- Verticordia roei Endl.

= Verticordia roei =

Roe's featherflower

Species of flowering plant

Verticordia roei, commonly known as Roe's featherflower is a flowering plant in the myrtle family, Myrtaceae and is endemic to the south-west of Western Australia. It is a shrub with narrow leaves and is often covered with masses of creamy-white coloured flowers in late spring.

== Description ==
Verticordia roei is a shrub which grows to a height of 1 m (3 ft) with a single main stem at its base. The leaves on the stems are linear to narrow elliptic in shape, triangular in cross-section, 1.5–4 mm (0.06–0.2 in) long and have a rounded end.

The flowers are scented and arranged in corymb-like groups on erect stalks from 12–20 mm (0.5–0.8 in) long. The floral cup is broadly hemispherical, about 1.5 mm (0.06 in) long, ribbed and covered with short hairs. The sepals are creamy-white, sometimes pink, 6–7 mm (0.2–0.3 in) long, with 5 to 7 long-hairy or feathery lobes. The petals are a similar colour to the sepals, 4–5 mm (0.16–0.20 in) long, dished with small teeth around its edge. The style is 1–3 mm (0.04–0.1 in) long, with a few short hairs. Flowering time is from October to November.

== Taxonomy and naming ==
Verticordia roei was first formally described by Stephan Endlicher in 1838 and the description was published in Stirpium Australasicarum Herbarii Hugeliani Decades Tres. The type specimen was collected by John Septimus Roe. The specific epithet (roei) honours Roe, the first surveyor-general of Western Australia.

In 1991, Alex George described two subspecies of V. roei in the journal Nuytsia, and the names are accepted by the Australian Plant Census:

- Verticordia roei Endl. subsp. roei has stamens 3–4 mm (0.12–0.16 in) long and styles 2–3 mm (0.079–0.118 in) long.
- Verticordia roei subsp. meiogona A.S.George has stamens 1.5–2.5 mm (0.059–0.098 in) long and styles 1.5–2.0 mm (0.059–0.079 in) long.

George placed V. roei in subgenus Verticordia, section Catocalypta along with V. inclusa, V. apecta, V. insignis, V. habrantha, V. lehmannii and V. pritzelii.

== Distribution and habitat ==
This verticordia usually occurs in sandy soil, often with clay or loam over laterite. Subspecies roei is widespread and locally common in areas between Merredin, Boorabbin, Wickepin, Hyden and Lake Grace in the Avon Wheatbelt, Coolgardie, Esperance Plains and Mallee biogeographic regions. Subspecies meiogona has a smaller distribution near Dalwallinu and Mukinbudin in the Avon Wheatbelt and Coolgardie bioregions.

== Conservation ==
Subspecies meiogona is classified as "Priority One" meaning that it is known from only one or a few locations which are potentially at risk. Subspecies roei is classified as "not threatened".

== Use in horticulture ==
Subspecies roei has proven to be difficult to propagate and maintain in cultivation but more success has been achieved with subspecies meiogona. The latter subspecies has been grown from cuttings and by grafting onto Chamelaucium uncinatum rootstock.
