= Johannes Conrad Schauer =

German botanist (1813–1848)

- Born: 16 February 1813; Frankfurt am Main, Germany
- Died: 24 October 1848 (aged 35); Eldena, Germany
- Scientific career
- Fields: botany
- Workplaces: University of Greifswald
- Author abbrev. (botany): Schauer

Johannes Conrad Schauer (16 February 1813 – 24 October 1848) was a botanist interested in spermatophytes. He was born in Frankfurt am Main and attended the gymnasium of Mainz from 1825 to 1837. For the next three years he worked at the Hofgarten of Würzburg. Schauer then gained a position as assistant at the botanical garden at Bonn where he worked until 1832 when he was placed in charge of the botanic garden in Breslau, (now Wrocław in Poland) with C.G. Nees. He gained the degree of Doctor of Philosophy at the University of Erlangen-Nuremberg 1835 and was appointed professor of botany at the University of Greifswald from 1843 until his death in 1848.

Although he never visited Australia, many Australian botanists and plant collectors sent him plant specimens, especially eucalypts and other members of the myrtle family, Myrtaceae. For example, when Allan Cunningham died in 1839, Schauer received many botanical specimens from the executor of Cunningham's estate, Robert Heward, including Eucalyptus clavigera (now Corymbia clavigera (A.Cunn. & Schauer) K.D. Hill & L.A.S. Johnson). Many of Schauer's descriptions were published in Walpers' Repertorium Botanices Systematicae and Dissertatio phytographica de Regelia, Beaufortia et Calothamno : generibus plantarum Myrtacearum.

The genus Schaueria (family Acanthaceae) was named in his honour by Nees (1838). Calothamnus schaueri and Beaufortia schaueri were also named in his honour.

== Selected publications ==
- "Acanthaceae" (with Christian Gottfried Daniel Nees von Esenbeck); part of the series Flora Brasiliensis, volume IX, fascicle VII, X.
- "Monographia Myrtacearum xerocarpicarum. Sectio I., Chamaelauciearum : hucusque cognitarum genera et species illustrans", 1840.
- "Chamaelaucieae : commentatio botanica", 1841.
- "Genera myrtacearum nova vel denuo recognita", 1843.
- "Dissertatio phytographica de Regelia, Beaufortia et calothamno, generibus plantarum myrtacearum", 1845.
