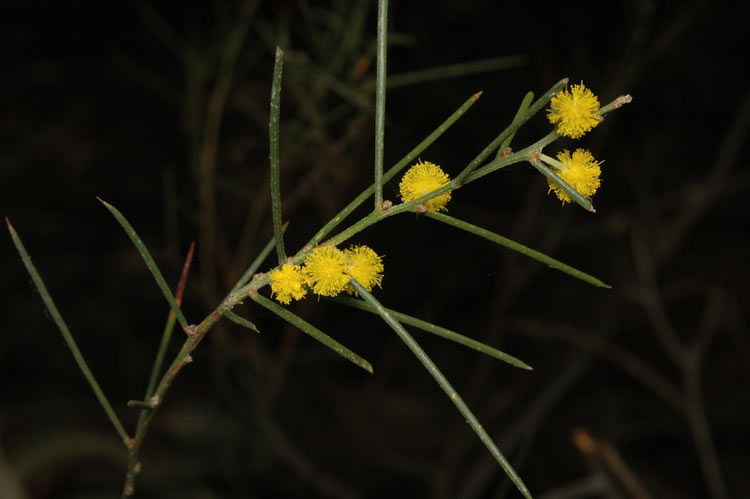

Conservation status
- Endangered (EPBC Act)

Scientific classification
- Kingdom: Plantae
- Clade: Tracheophytes
- Clade: Angiosperms
- Clade: Eudicots
- Clade: Rosids
- Order: Fabales
- Family: Fabaceae
- Subfamily: Caesalpinioideae
- Clade: Mimosoid clade
- Genus: Acacia
- Species: A. enterocarpa

Binomial name
- Acacia enterocarpa R.V.Sm.
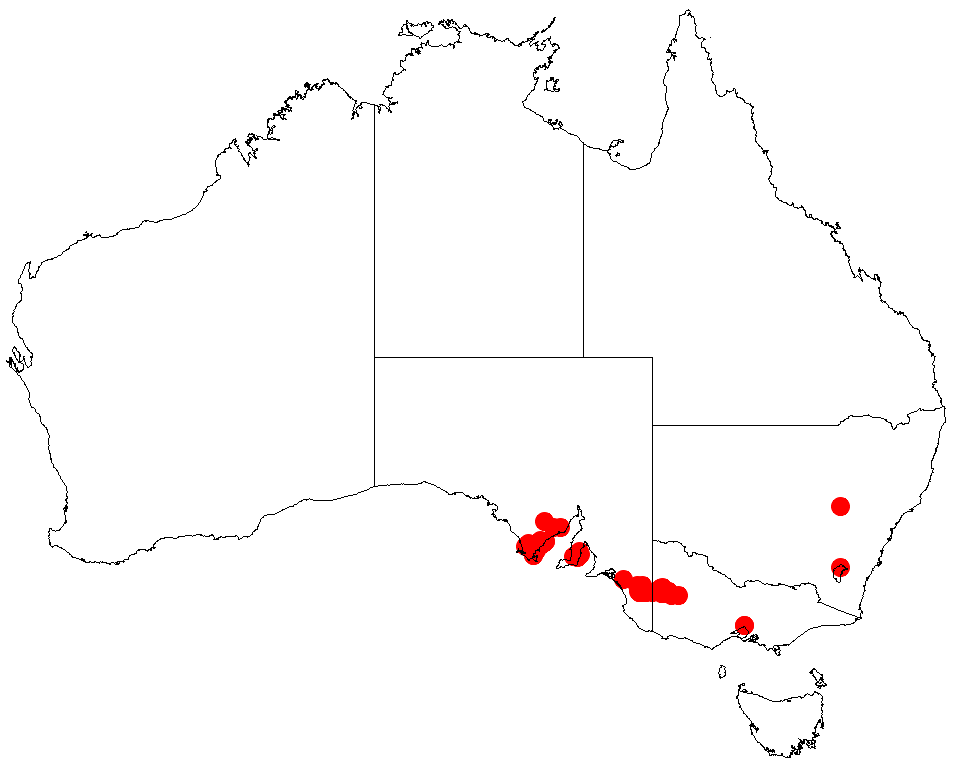
- Occurrence data from AVH

Synonyms
- Racosperma enterocarpum (R.V.Sm.) Pedley

= Acacia enterocarpa =

Jumping jack wattle

Species of plant

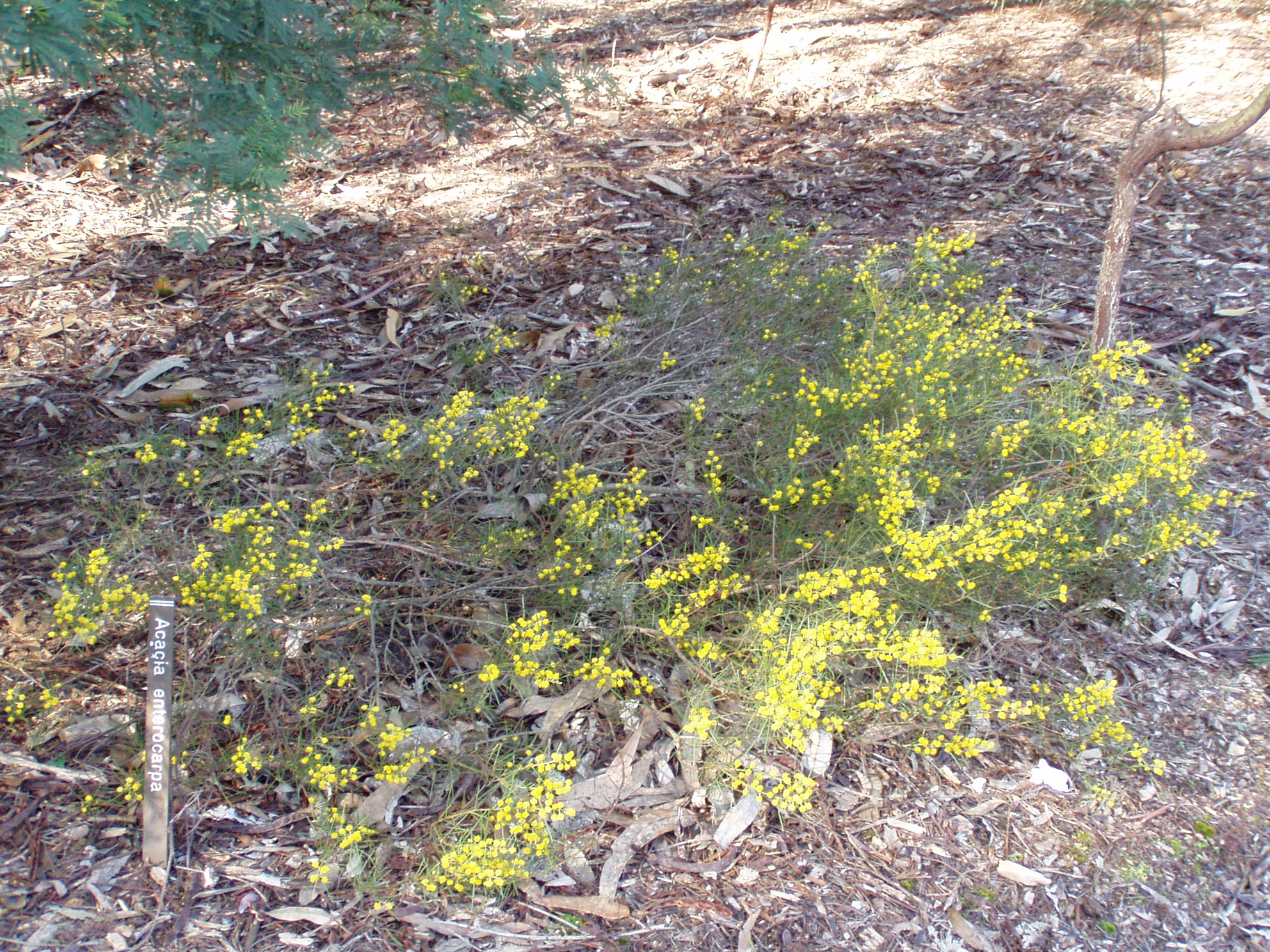
Habit in the Australian National Botanic Gardens

Acacia enterocarpa, commonly known as jumping jack wattle, is a species of flowering plant in the family Fabaceae and is endemic to the south of continental Australia. It is a dense, spreading shrub, with ribbed, reddish brown branchlets, more or less sessile straight to shallowly curved phyllodes, spherical heads of bright yellow flowers, and wavy, leathery pods.

== Description ==
Acacia enterocarpa is a dense, spreading shrub that typically grows to a height up to 1.5 m (4 ft 11 in) and has ribbed, reddish brown branchlets. The phyllodes are more or less sessile, straight to shallowly curved, more or less terete to compressed, 20–45 mm (0.79–1.77 in) long, 1.0–1.3 mm (0.039–0.051 in) wide, sharply pointed with 10 to 12 raised, warty veins. The flowers are borne in up to four spherical heads in axils on peduncles 3–5 mm (0.12–0.20 in) long. Each head is 3.5–4.5 mm (0.14–0.18 in) in diameter with about 20 bright yellow flowers. Flowering occurs from July to September, and the pods are wavy, up to about 20 mm (0.79 in) long, 2 mm (0.079 in) wide, brown and leathery. The seeds are oblong to elliptic, about 3 mm (0.12 in) long, dull, dark brown to black with an aril on the end.

== Taxonomy ==
Acacia enterocarpa was first formally described in 1957 by the botanist Raymond Vaughan Smith in The Victorian Naturalist from a specimen collected about 2 mi (3.2 km) west of Diapur in 1950. The specific epithet is derived from the Greek words entero meaning 'intestines' and "karpos" meaning 'fruit', in reference to the shape of the seed pod.

Both A. colletioides and A. nyssophylla are closely related to A. enterocarpa.

== Distribution and habitat ==
Jumping jack wattle has a disjunct distribution through parts of south eastern South Australia and western Victoria. It is found on the southern tip of the Eyre Peninsula and Yorke Peninsula from around Curramulka and near Bordertown extending eastwards as far as to Nhill in western Victoria. It is often found in woodland to open forest and grows in sandy alkaline soils as well as in neutral yellow duplex to red porous loamy soils and grey cracking clay soils.

== Conservation status ==
Acacia enterocarpa is listed as "endangered" under the Australian Government Environment Protection and Biodiversity Conservation Act 1999.

== See also ==
- List of Acacia species
