= Acacia subsessilis =

Conservation status
- Priority Three — Poorly Known Taxa (DEC)

Scientific classification
- Kingdom: Plantae
- Clade: Tracheophytes
- Clade: Angiosperms
- Clade: Eudicots
- Clade: Rosids
- Order: Fabales
- Family: Fabaceae
- Subfamily: Caesalpinioideae
- Clade: Mimosoid clade
- Genus: Acacia
- Species: A. subsessilis

Binomial name
- Acacia subsessilis A.R.Chapman & Maslin
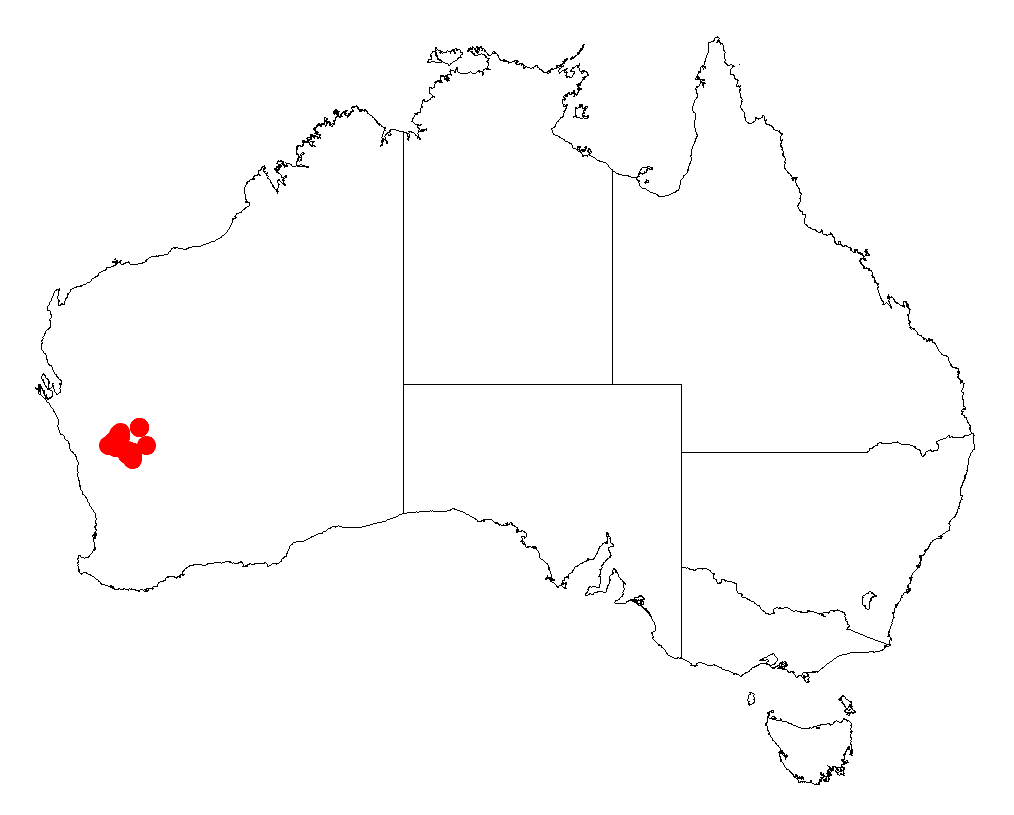
- Occurrence data from AVH

Species of legume

Acacia subsessilis is a shrub of the genus Acacia and the subgenus Plurinerves that is endemic to an area of western Australia.

== Description ==
The straggly and pungent shrub typically grows to a height of 1 to 2 metres (3 to 7 ft) and can have a rounded or funnel-shaped habit with glabrous and lenticellular branchlets that have raised stem-projections where phyllodes have been lost. Like most species of Acacia it has phyllodes rather than true leaves. The dull green to pale red coloured, rigid, pungent and glabrous phyllodes attach directly to the branchlets and mostly have a flat and narrowly linear shape with a length of 1 to 3 cm (0.39 to 1.18 in) and a width of 0.8 to 1.5 mm (0.031 to 0.059 in) and have eight nerves in total with three per face. It blooms from July to August and produces yellow flowers. The simple inflorescences occur singly in the axils and have shortly cylindrical to obloid shaped flower-heads that are 7 to 15 mm (0.28 to 0.59 in) in length and have a diameter of 4 to 6 mm (0.16 to 0.24 in). Following flowering it produces thinly leathery to crustaceous seed pods that resemble a string of beads and are up to 8 cm (3.1 in) in length with a width of 5 to 6 mm (0.20 to 0.24 in) and contain shiny black seeds with an elliptic and a length of about 4 mm (0.16 in) with a creamy coloured aril.

== Taxonomy ==
It is closely related to Acacia diallaga both of which have phyllodes that change colour from green to a pale reddish hue during drought, it also is superficially similar to Acacia colletioides and Acacia chapmanii.

== Distribution ==
It is native to an area in the Mid West and Wheatbelt regions of Western Australia where it is commonly situated on rocky hills growing in stony gravel or sandy soils over or around ironstone. It has a disjunct distribution over a limited range from around Mount Farmer Station in the west to Yalgoo in the east where it is usually a part of open shrubland communities.

== See also ==
- List of Acacia species
