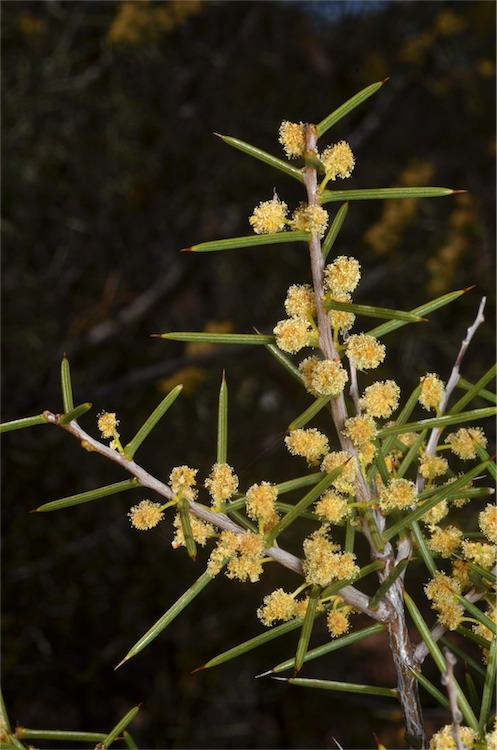
- In Murray-Sunset National Park

Scientific classification
- Kingdom: Plantae
- Clade: Tracheophytes
- Clade: Angiosperms
- Clade: Eudicots
- Clade: Rosids
- Order: Fabales
- Family: Fabaceae
- Subfamily: Caesalpinioideae
- Clade: Mimosoid clade
- Genus: Acacia
- Species: A. colletioides

Binomial name
- Acacia colletioides Benth.
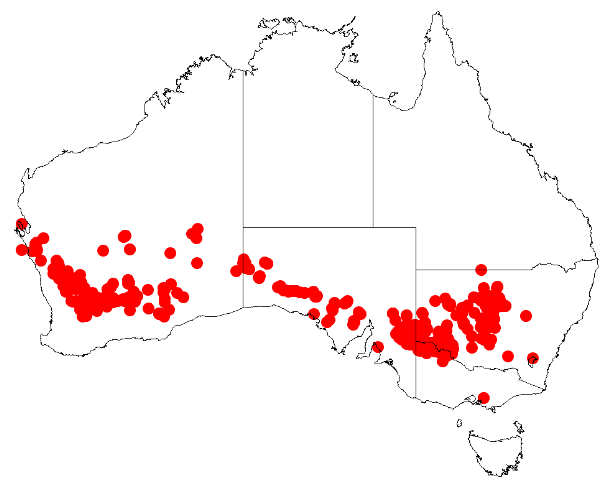
- Occurrence data from AVH

Synonyms
- Acacia colletioides Benth. var. colletioides; Acacia colletioides var. typica Domin nom. inval., nom. nud.; Acacia nyssophylla F.Muell. p.p.; Racosperma colletioides (Benth.) Pedley

= Acacia colletioides =

Wait-a-while

Species of legume

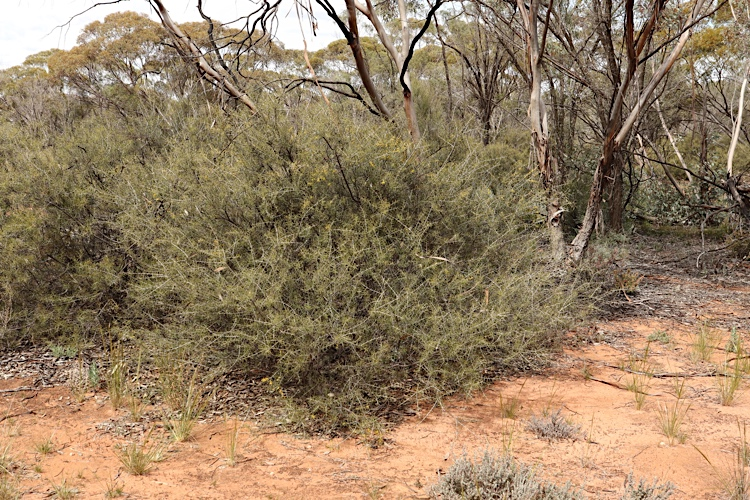
Habit, about 65 km (40 mi) north of Robinvale

Acacia colletioides, commonly known as wait-a-while, pin bush or spinebush, is a species of flowering plant in the family Fabaceae and is endemic to southern continental Australia. It is a rigid shrub or tree with sessile, straight to more or less curved and terete phyllodes, more or less spherical heads of bright yellow flowers, and linear, thinly leathery pods.

== Description ==
Acacia colletioides is a shrub or tree that typically grows to a height of 0.5–3 m (1 ft 8 in – 9 ft 10 in) and has mostly glabrous branchlets with scars where phyllodes have fallen. The phyllodes are sessile and inserted on distinct, yellow stem-projections. The phyllodes are straight to more or less curved, more or less terete, usually 15–30 mm (0.59–1.18 in) long and 1.0–1.5 mm (0.039–0.059 in) wide tapered and sharply pointed. The flowers are borne in two, more or less spherical or widely elliptic heads 3–5 mm (0.12–0.20 in) long and 3–4.5 mm (0.12–0.18 in) in diameter in axils on peduncles 1.5–5 mm (0.059–0.197 in) long. Each head has 12 to 24 bright yellow flowers. Flowering occurs from July to November and the pods are linear, constricted between the seeds, up to 70 mm (2.8 in) long and 3–5 mm (0.12–0.20 in) wide, thinly leathery and glabrous. The seeds are oval to egg-shaped, black, shiny and 3.5–4.0 mm (0.14–0.16 in) long with an orange or yellow aril nearly surrounding the seed.

== Taxonomy ==
Acacia colletioides was first formally described in 1842 by the botanist George Bentham in Hooker's London Journal of Botany from specimens collected by Allan Cunnigham on the "Harrington Plains" in the "interior of New South Wales". The specific epithet (colletioides) is named for the resemblance of the spiny, rigid foliage, appearing like that of some species in the genus Colletia.

This species is closely related to Acacia nyssophylla, and is similar in appearance to A. asepala, A. subsessilis and A. enterocarpa.

== Distribution ==
Wait-a-while is found in dry areas from around Geraldton on the west coast of Western Australia, through part of South Australia and north western Victoria to the western slopes and plains, south and west of the Byrock-Nyngan area in New South Wales, where it grows in mallee shrubland or open woodland. In Western Australia it occurs in the Avon Wheatbelt, Coolgardie, Gascoyne, Geraldton Sandplains, Gibson Desert, Great Victoria Desert, Murchison, Nullarbor and Yalgoo bioregions where it grows in a variety of soil types. In Victoria it is found in the Murray mallee, the Lowan mallee, the Murray scroll belt and the Robinvale Plains bioregions where it is found in the north-west mostly as a part of mallee scrub or open woodland communities growing in sandy loam soils.

== See also ==
- List of Acacia species
