= Acacia calcarata =

Scientific classification
- Kingdom: Plantae
- Clade: Tracheophytes
- Clade: Angiosperms
- Clade: Eudicots
- Clade: Rosids
- Order: Fabales
- Family: Fabaceae
- Subfamily: Caesalpinioideae
- Clade: Mimosoid clade
- Genus: Acacia
- Species: A. calcarata

Binomial name
- Acacia calcarata Maiden & Blakely
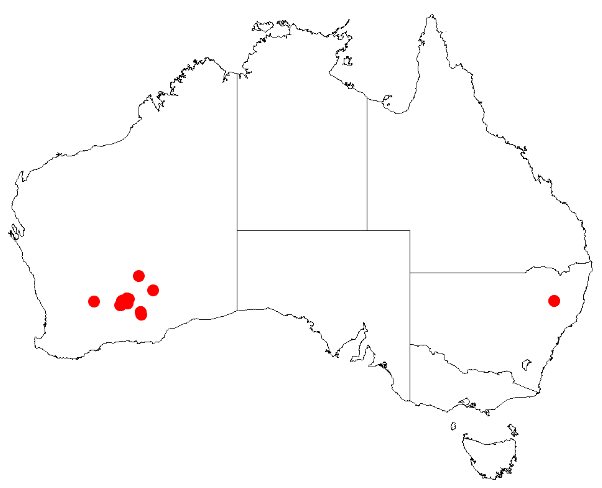
- Occurrence data from AVH

Synonyms
- Racosperma calcaratum (Maiden & Blakely) Pedley

Species of legume

Acacia calcarata is a species of flowering plant in the family Fabaceae and is endemic to inland Western Australia. It is a spreading, prickly shrub with rigid, slightly curved and kinked phyllodes, spherical heads of golden-yellow flowers, and narrowly oblong pods.

== Description ==
Acacia calcarata is a spreading, prickly shrub that typically grows to a height of 0.5 to 1.5 metres (2 to 5 ft) and has branchlets that are reddish near their tips, later glabrous and light grey. The phyllodes are rigid, upright to erect, sharply pointed, usually slightly curved and kinked near the gland, 20–40 mm (0.79–1.57 in) long and about 1.5 mm (0.059 in) wide. The gland is about 1 mm (0.039 in) above the base of the phyllode and there are spiny stipules at the base. The flowers are usually borne in two spherical heads in axils, on a peduncle 3.5–7 mm (0.14–0.28 in) long, each head with 16 to 22 golden yellow flowers. Flowering occurs from July to August and the pods are flat, narrowly oblong, blackish, up to 70 mm (2.8 in) long, 10 mm (0.39 in) wide and thinly crust-like containing elliptic seeds about 12 mm (0.47 in) long with a mushroom-shaped aril.

== Taxonomy ==
Acacia calcarata was first formally described by the botanists Joseph Maiden and William Blakely in 1928 in the Journal of the Royal Society of Western Australia. The specific epithet (calcarata) means 'spurred', referring to the stipules.

This species is similar to Acacia inamabilis which has much narrower pods, the phyllodes and branchlets of A. calcarata like those of Acacia asepala.

== Distribution and habitat ==
Acacia calcarata grows in loam in open mallee scrub or tall shrubland near Bullabulling and Kalgoorlie, and south-east to Woodline near Norseman, in the Coolgardie and Murchison bioregions of inland Western Australia.

== See also ==
- List of Acacia species
