= Acacia kerryana =

Conservation status
- Priority Two — Poorly Known Taxa (DEC)

Scientific classification
- Kingdom: Plantae
- Clade: Embryophytes
- Clade: Tracheophytes
- Clade: Spermatophytes
- Clade: Angiosperms
- Clade: Eudicots
- Clade: Rosids
- Order: Fabales
- Family: Fabaceae
- Subfamily: Caesalpinioideae
- Clade: Mimosoid clade
- Genus: Acacia
- Species: A. kerryana

Binomial name
- Acacia kerryana Maslin
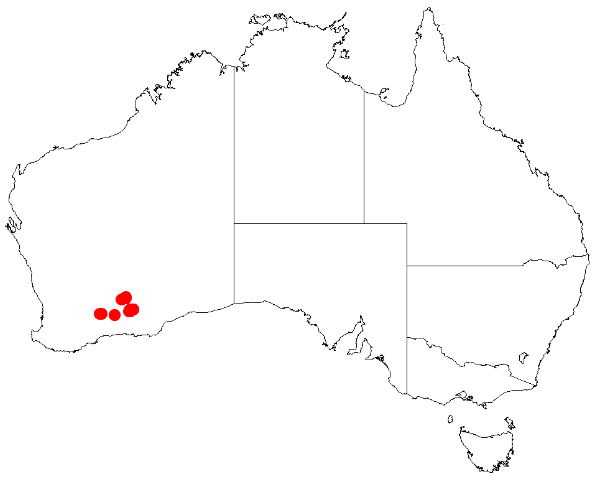
- Occurrence data from AVH

Synonyms
- Racosperma kerryanum (Maslin) Pedley

Species of legume

Acacia kerryana is a species of flowering plant in the family Fabaceae and is endemic to the south-west of Western Australia. It is low, dense, spreading shrub with sessile, twisted, terete phyllodes, oblong to short-cylindrical heads of light golden yellow flowers in axils, and linear, twisted, leathery pods.

== Description ==
Acacia kerryana is a low, dense, spreading domed shrub that typically grows to a height of 0.3–1 m (1 ft 0 in – 3 ft 3 in) and has branchlets that are slightly ribbed and twisted near the ends. Its phyllodes are sessile, twisted, terete and downturned, 80–160 mm (3.1–6.3 in) long, 0.4–0.6 mm (0.016–0.024 in) wide and eight veins, often with a strongly curved tip. The flowers are arranged in two or three oblong to short-cylindrical heads in axils, on peduncles 6–13 mm (0.24–0.51 in) long, each head 6–9 mm (0.24–0.35 in) long and 3–4 mm (0.12–0.16 in) wide with light golden yellow flowers. Flowering occurs from October to December or in January and February, and the pods are linear, twisted and leathery, up to 85 mm (3.3 in) long and 2 mm (0.079 in) wide.

== Taxonomy ==
Acacia kerryana was first formally described in 1982 by the botanist Bruce Maslin in the journal Nuytsia from specimens he collected near Spargoville, about 45 km (28 mi) south of Coolgardie in 1981. The specific epithet (kerryana) honours Kerry Ward, librarian at the Western Australian Herbarium from 1975 to 1977.

== Distribution and habitat ==
This species of wattle grows on undulating plains and low stony ridges in granitic loamy sands or clay sand soils in scattered locations between Kambalda, Lake Cronin and Norseman in the Coolgardie bioregion of south-western Western Australia.

== See also ==
- List of Acacia species
