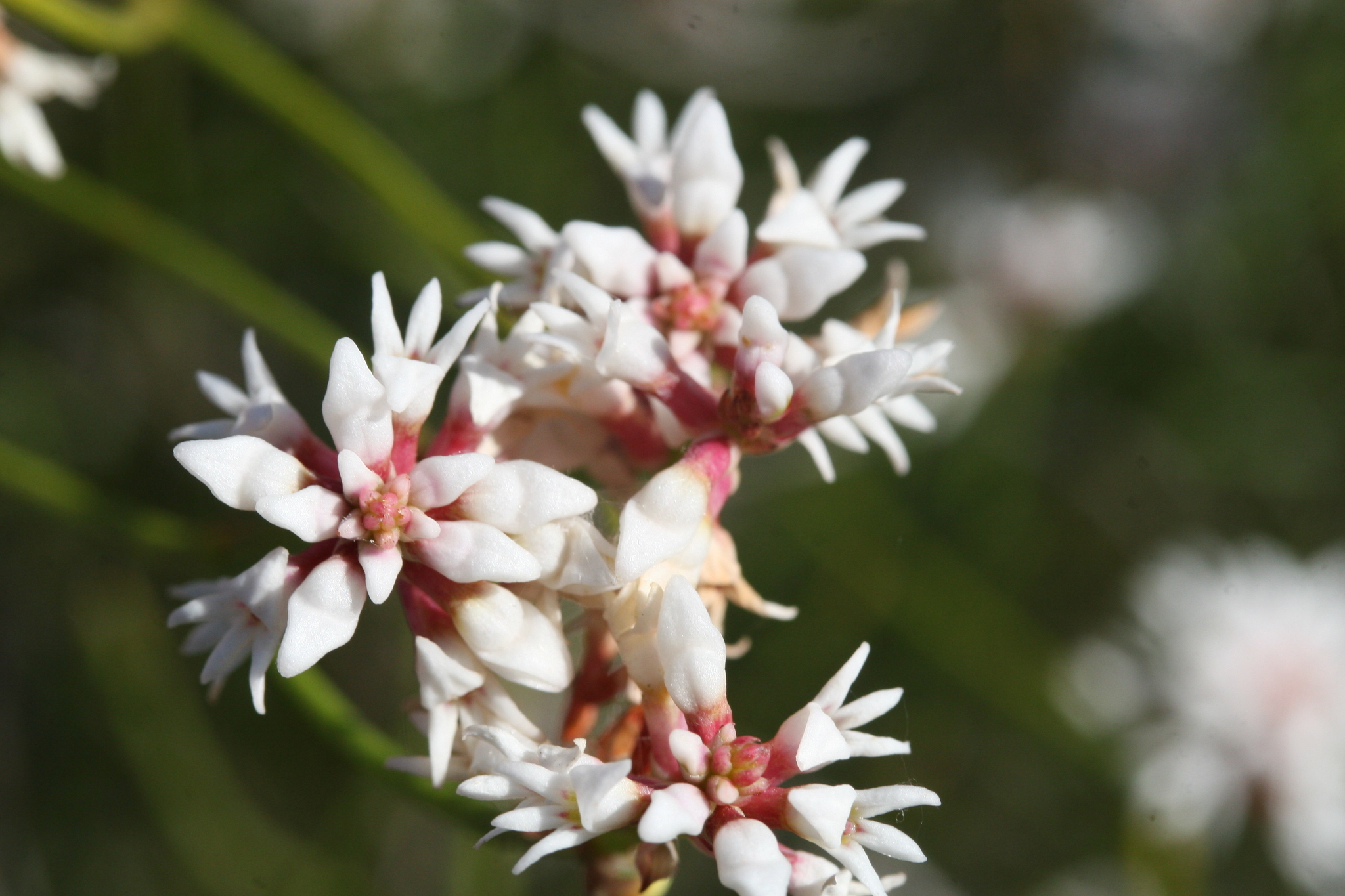
- Conospermum leianthum subsp. leianthum

Scientific classification
- Kingdom: Plantae
- Clade: Tracheophytes
- Clade: Angiosperms
- Clade: Eudicots
- Order: Proteales
- Family: Proteaceae
- Genus: Conospermum
- Species: C. leianthum

Binomial name
- Conospermum leianthum (Benth.) Diels

= Conospermum leianthum =

Species of Australian shrub

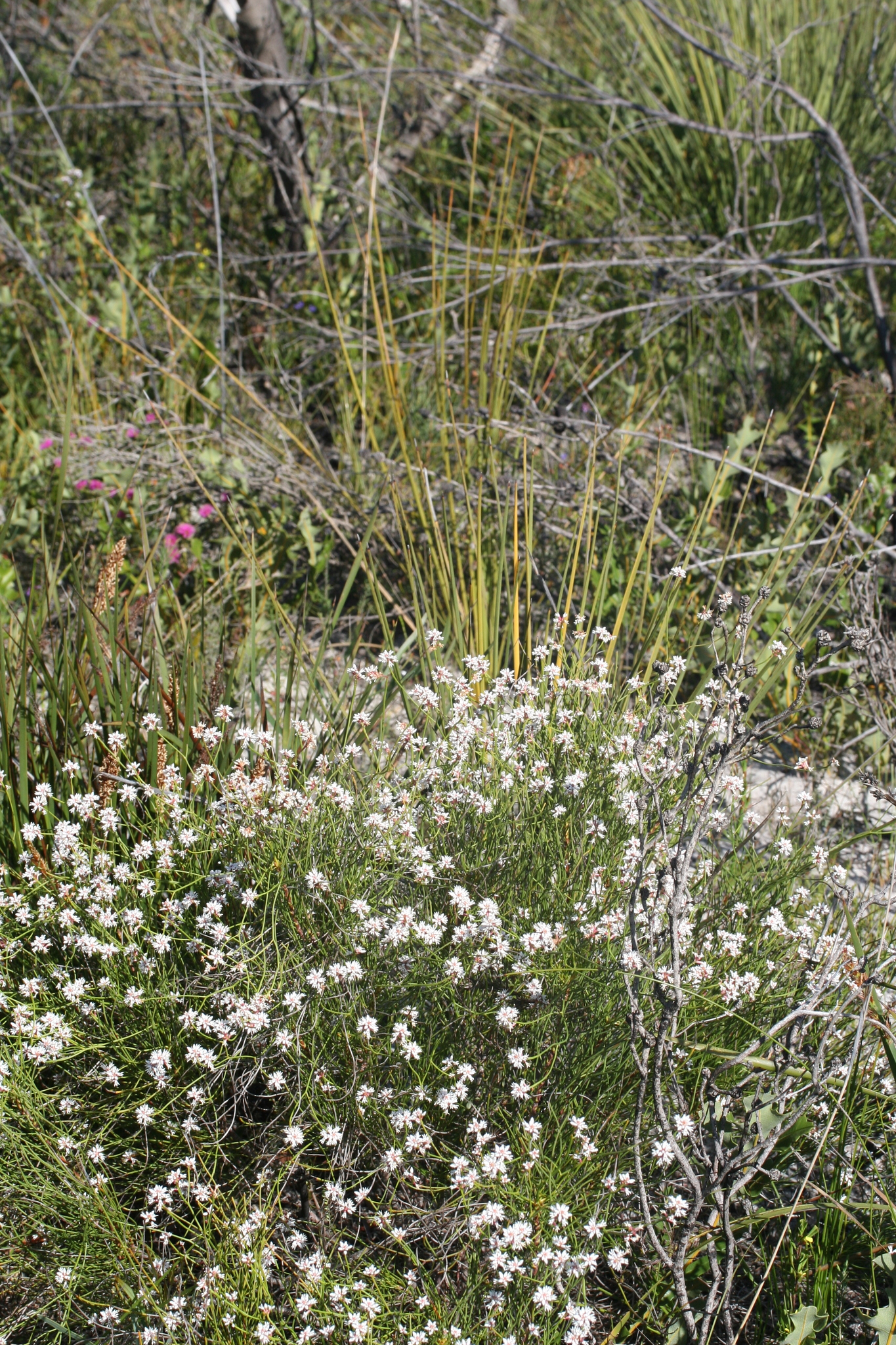
Habit in Hopetoun

Conospermum leianthum is a species of flowering plant in the family Proteaceae and is endemic to the south-west of Western Australia. It is a shrub with thread-like leaves, and panicles of white and more or less purple, tube-shaped flowers.

== Description ==
Conospermum leianthum is a shrub that typically grows to a height of up to 1.1 m (3 ft 7 in), its leaves erect, s-shaped or curved, 10–170 mm (0.39–6.69 in) long and 0.5–1.3 mm (0.020–0.051 in) long. The flowers are arranged in panicles in leaf axils, on a peduncle 6–160 mm (0.24–6.30 in) long, each branch of the panicle ending in a dense head, sometimes longer than the leaves. There are hairy, kidney-shaped bracteoles 1.5–3 mm (0.059–0.118 in) long and 1.5–2.5 mm (0.059–0.098 in) wide. The perianth is tube-shaped, 2–4 mm (0.079–0.157 in) long, white with a more or less purple base, the upper lip usually 2–3 mm (0.079–0.118 in) long and 1.2–2 mm (0.047–0.079 in) wide, the lower lip joined for about 0.75 mm (0.030 in), 1.5–2.5 mm (0.059–0.098 in) long and 0.5–1 mm (0.020–0.039 in). Flowering time depends on subspecies, and fruit is a nut covered with woolly, gold-coloured hairs, and 1.5–2 mm (0.059–0.079 in) long and 2 mm (0.079 in) wide.

== Taxonomy ==
This species was first formally described in 1870 by George Bentham who gave it the name Conospermum polycephalum var. leianthum in his Flora Australiensis, from specimens collected by George Maxwell. In 1904, Ludwig Diels raised the subspecies to Conospermum leianthum in Botanische Jahrbücher für Systematik, Pflanzengeschichte und Pflanzengeographie, and in 1995, Eleanor Marion Bennett described C. leianthum subsp. orientale in the Flora of Australia, and that name, and the autonym are accepted by the Australian Plant Census:

- Conospermum leianthum (Benth.) Diels subsp. leianthum (the autonym) has stem leaves 100–170 mm (3.9–6.7 in) long, the panicles much longer than the leaves, and white or cream-coloured flowers in October and November.
- Conospermum leianthum subsp. orientale E.M.Benn. has stem leaves 40–70 mm (1.6–2.8 in) long, the panicles only slightly longer than the leaves, and white and deep pink flowers from September to December.

The specific epithet (leianthum) means 'smooth flowered'.

== Distribution and habitat ==
Conospermum leianthum is common in coastal areas between Ravensthorpe and Cape Arid National Park where it grows in sandy soils. Subspecies leianthum is found between Forrestania and east of Esperance in the Coolgardie, Esperance Plains and Mallee bioregions of south-western Western Australia. Subspecies orientale occurs from east of Esperance to Israelite Bay in the Esperance Plains and Mallee bioregions.

== Conservation status ==
Both subspecies of C. leianthum are listed as "not threatened" by the government of Western Australia.
