= Eucalyptus polita =

Scientific classification
- Kingdom: Plantae
- Clade: Tracheophytes
- Clade: Angiosperms
- Clade: Eudicots
- Clade: Rosids
- Order: Myrtales
- Family: Myrtaceae
- Genus: Eucalyptus
- Species: E. polita

Binomial name
- Eucalyptus polita Brooker & Hopper

Species of eucalyptus

Eucalyptus polita, also known as Parker Range mallet, is a species of mallet or small tree that is endemic to the southwest of Western Australia. It has smooth, greyish bark, narrow lance-shaped adult leaves, flower buds in groups of between seven and eleven, white flowers and cup-shaped fruit.

== Description ==
Eucalyptus polita is a mallet or tree that typically grows to a height of 3–10 m (9.8–32.8 ft) but does not form a lignotuber. It has smooth greyish bark that is shed in long ribbons to reveal orange-coloured new bark. Young plants and coppice regrowth have dull green, lance-shaped leaves that are 55–100 mm (2.2–3.9 in) long and 8–20 mm (0.31–0.79 in) wide. Adult leaves are the same shade of glossy green on both sides, narrow lance-shaped, 70–120 mm (2.8–4.7 in) long and 7–15 mm (0.28–0.59 in) wide, tapering to a petiole 10–20 mm (0.39–0.79 in) long. The flower buds are arranged in leaf axils in groups of seven, nine or eleven on a flattened, unbranched peduncle 4–10 mm (0.16–0.39 in) long, the individual buds sessile or on pedicels up to 1 mm (0.039 in) long. Mature buds are oval to more or less cylindrical, 6–7 mm (0.24–0.28 in) long and about 4 mm (0.16 in) wide with a conical, striated operculum. The flowers are white and the fruit is a woody, cup-shaped capsule 4–5 mm (0.16–0.20 in) long and 4–7 mm (0.16–0.28 in) wide with the valves near rim level.

== Taxonomy and naming ==
Eucalyptus polita was first formally described in 1993 by Ian Brooker and Stephen Hopper in the journal Nuytsia from material collected by Brooker on the Hyden - Norseman track in 1983. The specific epithet (polita) is from the Latin politus meaning "polished", referring to the bark.

== Distribution and habitat ==
This mallet grows around salt lakes and on flat areas from Forrestania to near Marvel Loch in the Avon Wheatbelt, Coolgardie and Mallee biogeographic regions.

== Conservation status ==
This mallee eucalypt is classified as "not threatened" by the Western Australian Government Department of Parks and Wildlife.

== See also ==
- List of Eucalyptus species
