= Calytrix merralliana =

Scientific classification
- Kingdom: Plantae
- Clade: Tracheophytes
- Clade: Angiosperms
- Clade: Eudicots
- Clade: Rosids
- Order: Myrtales
- Family: Myrtaceae
- Genus: Calytrix
- Species: C. merralliana

Binomial name
- Calytrix merralliana (F.Muell. & Tate) Craven

Synonyms
- Calytrix merrelliana Craven orth. var.; Lhotskya violacea var. merralliana F.Muell. & Tate; Lhotzkya violacea var. merrelliana F.Muell. & Tate orth. var.

Species of flowering plant

Calytrix merralliana is a species of flowering plant in the myrtle family Myrtaceae and is endemic to inland areas of Western Australia. It is a glabrous shrub with linear to elliptic leaves and violet flowers with about 45 to 55 yellow stamens in several rows.

== Description ==
Calytrix merralliana is a glabrous shrub that typically grows to a height of up to 20 cm (7.9 in). Its leaves are linear to elliptic, 1.5–3 mm (0.059–0.118 in) long and 0.4–0.8 mm (0.016–0.031 in) wide on a petiole 0.25–0.50 mm (0.0098–0.0197 in) long. There are stipules up to 0.3 mm (0.012 in) long at the base of the petiole. The flowers are borne on a peduncle 2.25–4.0 mm (0.089–0.157 in) long with more or less round bracteoles 4–5 mm (0.16–0.20 in) long but that fall off as the flowers open. The floral tube is 4–5 mm (0.16–0.20 in) long and has 10 ribs. The sepals are fused at the base, with egg-shaped to broadly egg-shaped lobes 1.25–2.0 mm (0.049–0.079 in) long and 1.6–2.25 mm (0.063–0.089 in) wide. The petals are violet, egg-shaped to elliptic, 5.5–7.5 mm (0.22–0.30 in) long and 3.25–3.75 mm (0.128–0.148 in) wide, and there are about 45 to 55 yellow stamens in several rows, and that turn reddish purple as they age. Flowering occurs from October to December.

== Taxonomy ==
This species was first formally described in 1896 by Ferdinand von Mueller and Ralph Tate, who gave it the name Lhotskya violacea var. merralliana in Transactions, proceedings and report of the Royal Society of South Australia. In 1987, Lyndley Craven transferred the variety to Calytrix as C. merralliana in the journal Brunonia. The specific epithet (merralliana) honours Edwin Merrall, (spelt "Merell" in Mueller's and Tate's paper, but "Merall" on the type specimens held in the National Herbarium of Victoria).

== Distribution and habitat ==
Calytrix merralliana grows on yellow sand and gravelly sand between the Southern Cross-Kalgoorlie districts and Lake Cronin in the Coolgardie and Mallee bioregions of inland Western Australia.
