= Acacia inamabilis =

Scientific classification
- Kingdom: Plantae
- Clade: Embryophytes
- Clade: Tracheophytes
- Clade: Angiosperms
- Clade: Eudicots
- Clade: Rosids
- Order: Fabales
- Family: Fabaceae
- Subfamily: Caesalpinioideae
- Clade: Mimosoid clade
- Genus: Acacia
- Species: A. inamabilis

Binomial name
- Acacia inamabilis E.Pritz.
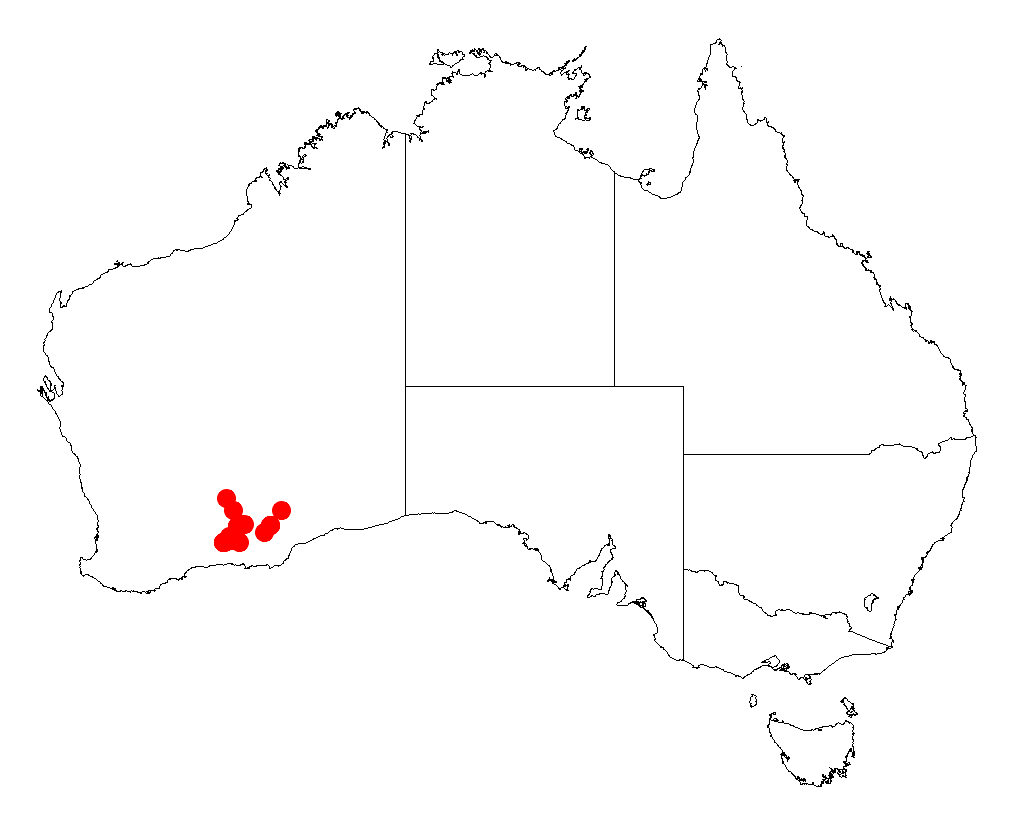
- Occurrence data from AVH

Synonyms
- Racosperma inamabile (E.Pritz.) Pedley

Species of legume

Acacia inamabilis is a species of flowering plant in the family Fabaceae and is endemic to inland areas of Western Australia. It is a harsh, spreading shrub with stout, usually glabrous branchlets, sessile, straight or slightly curved, rigid, sharply pointed phyllodes, two to four spherical heads of golden yellow flowers, and linear, crusty blackish pods.

== Description ==
Acacia inamabilis is a harsh, spreading shrub that typically grows to a height of 0.2–1.3 m (7.9 in – 4 ft 3.2 in) and has stout, green, ribbed, usually glabrous branchlets. Its phyllodes are sessile, straight or slightly curved, rigid, sharply pointed and five-sided in cross-section, 20–45 mm (0.79–1.77 in) long and about 1.5 mm (0.059 in) wide. There are spiny stipules 2.5–5 mm (0.098–0.197 in) long at the base of the phyllodes. The phyllodes have five veins, and there is a gland 1–2 mm (0.039–0.079 in) long, 1–5 mm (0.039–0.197 in) above the base of the phyllode. The flowers are borne in two to four spherical heads on glabrous, yellow to light brown peduncles 3–5 mm (0.12–0.20 in) long, each head with about 25 golden yellow flowers. Flowering occurs in August and September, and the pods are linear, up to 90 mm (3.5 in) long and about 4.5 mm (0.18 in) wide, blackish, glabrous and crusty.

== Taxonomy ==
Acacia inamabilis was first formally described in 1904 by the botanist Ernst Georg Pritzel in Botanische Jahrbücher für Systematik, Pflanzengeschichte und Pflanzengeographie. The specific epithet (inamabilis) means 'unfriendly' or 'unlovely', referring to the sharply pointed stipules.

A. inamabilis is related to A. concolorans, and is sometimes mistaken for A. calcarata.

== Distribution and habitat ==
This species of wattle has a scattered distribution between Mount Malcolm in the Fraser Range, Norseman and near Peak Charles National Park in the Coolgardie and Mallee bioregions of inland Western Australia. It grows near granite outcrops and salt lakes, in sandy and loamy soils in woodland or mallee communities.

== Conservation status ==
Acacia inamabilis is listed as "not threatened" by the Western Australian Government Department of Biodiversity, Conservation and Attractions.

== See also ==
- List of Acacia species
