= Acacia concolorans =

Conservation status
- Priority Two — Poorly Known Taxa (DEC)

Scientific classification
- Kingdom: Plantae
- Clade: Tracheophytes
- Clade: Angiosperms
- Clade: Eudicots
- Clade: Rosids
- Order: Fabales
- Family: Fabaceae
- Subfamily: Caesalpinioideae
- Clade: Mimosoid clade
- Genus: Acacia
- Species: A. concolorans

Binomial name
- Acacia concolorans Maslin
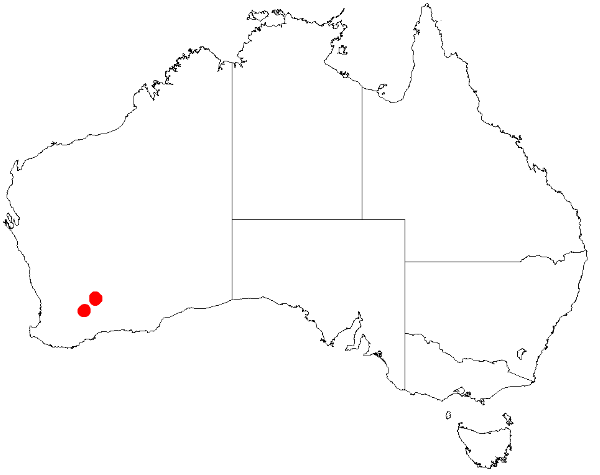
- Occurrence data from AVH

Species of legume

Acacia concolorans is a species of flowering plant in the family Fabaceae and is endemic to the south-west of Western Australia. It is a harsh, intricately branched, sprawling or compact subshrub with green branchlets, sessile oblong to narrowly oblong, sharply-pointed phyllodes, spherical heads of golden yellow flowers and narrowly oblong, variably curved pods.

== Description ==
Acacia concolorans is an intricately branched, sprawling or compact subshrub that typically grows to a height of up to 40–50 cm (16–20 in) and has branchlets are rough, green and finely yellow-ribbed. Its phyllodes are sessile, flat, thick and sharply pointed, 4–10 mm (0.16–0.39 in) long and 1.5–2 mm (0.059–0.079 in) wide with five veins. There are spiny stipules 2 mm (0.079 in) long at the base of the phyllodes. The flowers are borne in 2 spherical heads in axils on a peduncle 1.5–3 mm (0.059–0.118 in) long, each head small with 7 or 8 golden yellow flowers. Flowering has been recorded from June to September and the pods are narrowly oblong, variably curved, up to 50 mm (2.0 in) long, 4–5 mm (0.16–0.20 in) wide and thinly leathery to crusty and glabrous. The seeds are egg-shaped to elliptic, 2.5–3.0 mm (0.098–0.118 in) long, dark brown, somewhat shiny with an aril at least half the length of the seed.

== Taxonomy ==
Acacia concolorans was first formally described in 1999 by the botanist Bruce Maslin in the journal Nuytsia from specimens he collected at the north-east end of the Parker Range, 47.5 km (29.5 mi) south-south-east of Southern Cross. The specific epithet (concolorans) means 'uniform in colour', referring to the branchlets and phyllodes that are of the same green colour.

This species is closely related to Acacia inamabilis which has larger phyllodes and flower-heads with about 25 flowers.

== Distribution ==
This species of wattle is only known from a small area near the type location and near Kalgarin, in the Avon Wheatbelt, Coolgardie and Mallee bioregions of Western Australia where it grows on lateritic flats and hills in red to brown loam-clay soils in open Eucalyptus woodland or mallee shrubland.

== Conservation status ==
Acacia concolorans is listed as "Priority Two" by the Government of Western Australia Department of Biodiversity, Conservation and Attractions, meaning that it is poorly known and from one or a few locations.

== See also ==
- List of Acacia species
