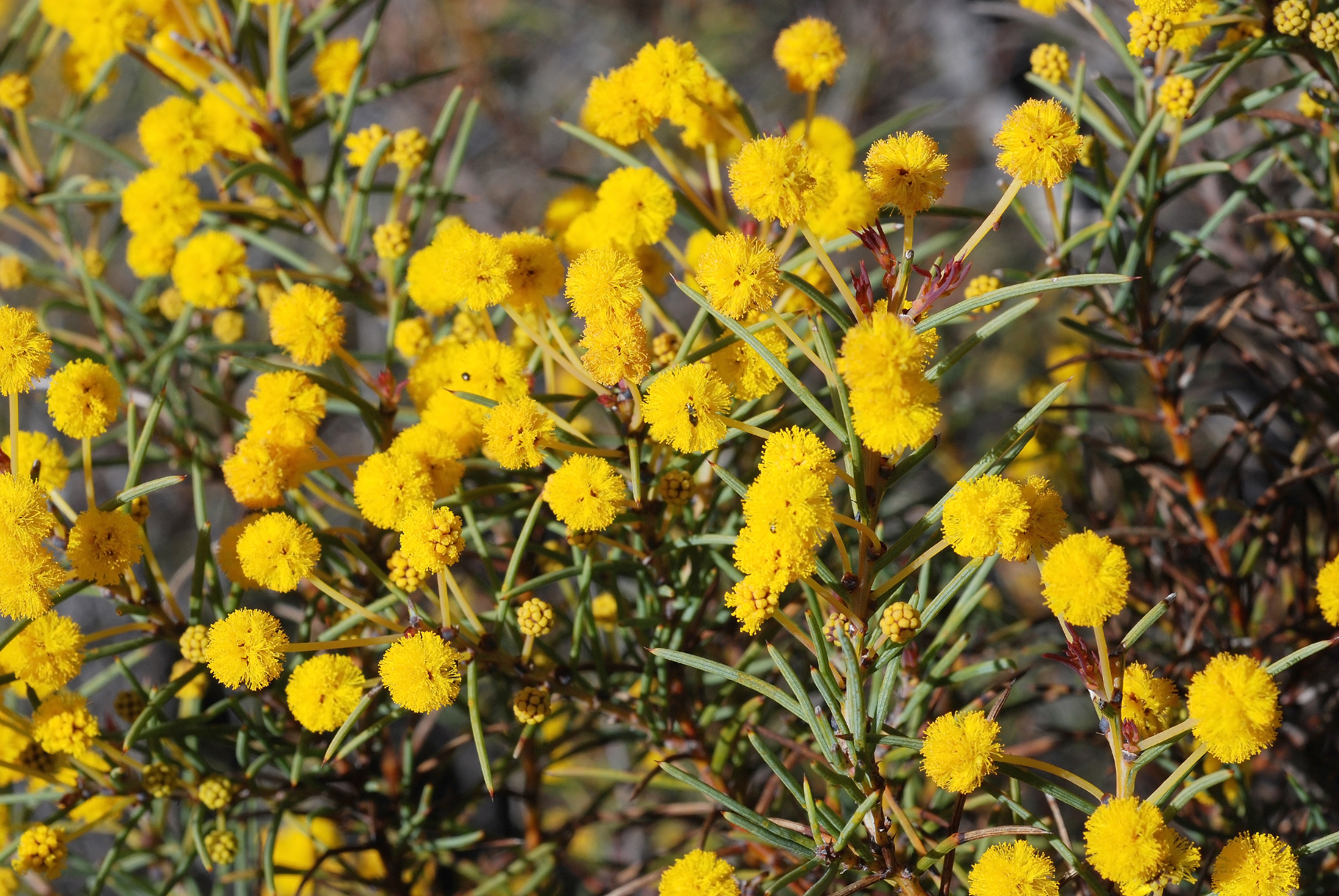
- Subspecies australis

Scientific classification
- Kingdom: Plantae
- Clade: Tracheophytes
- Clade: Angiosperms
- Clade: Eudicots
- Clade: Rosids
- Order: Fabales
- Family: Fabaceae
- Subfamily: Caesalpinioideae
- Clade: Mimosoid clade
- Genus: Acacia
- Species: A. chapmanii

Binomial name
- Acacia chapmanii R.S.Cowan & Maslin
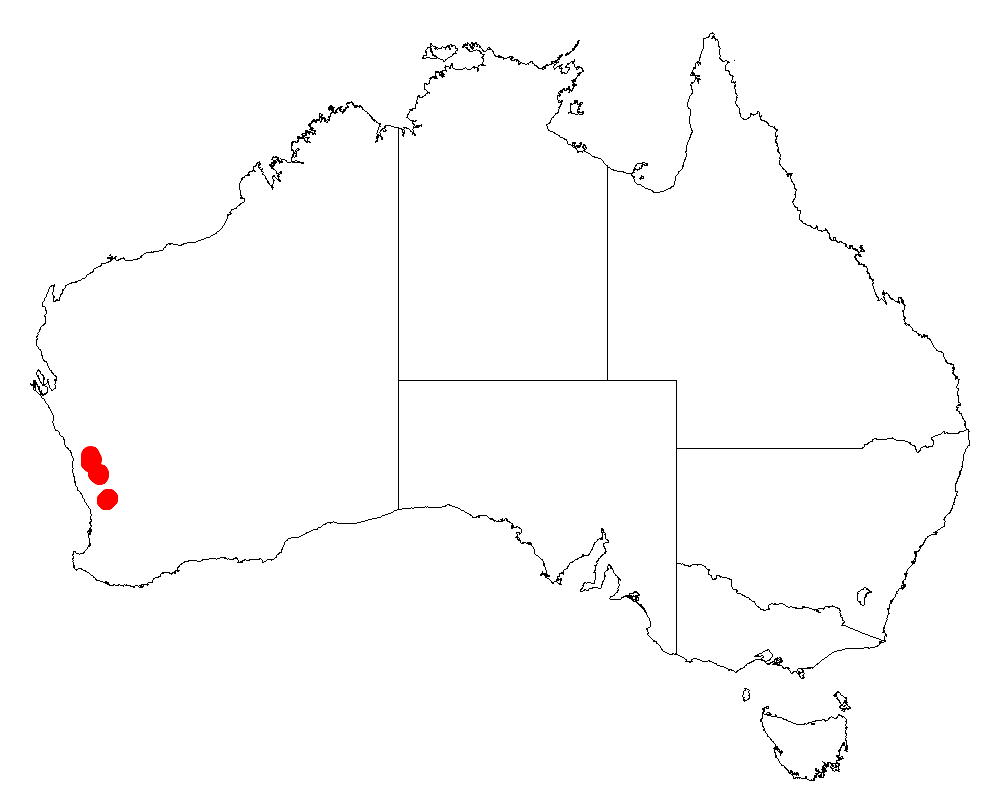
- Occurrence data from AVH

= Acacia chapmanii =

Species of legume

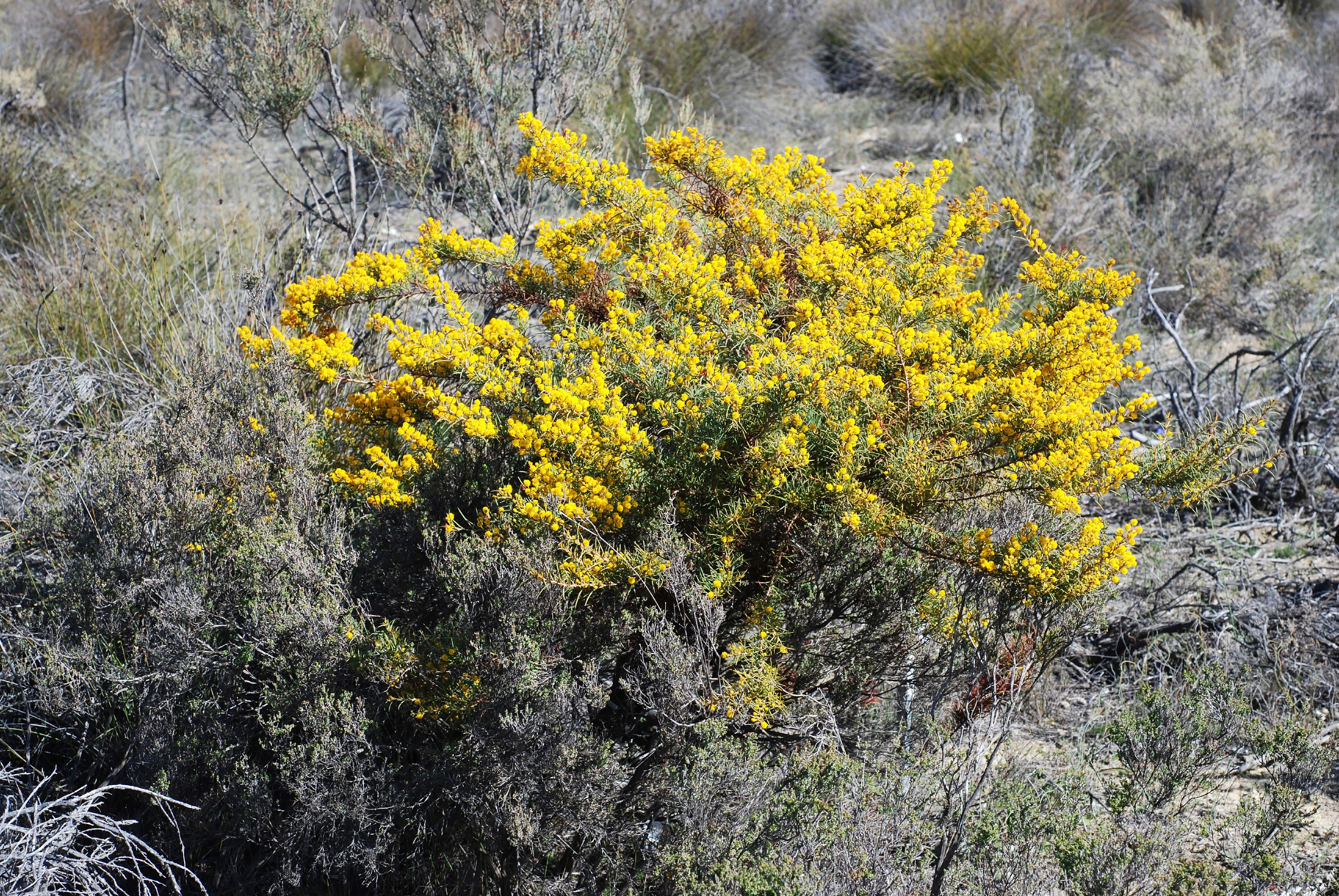
Habit (subsp. australis)

Acacia chapmanii is a species of flowering plant in the family Fabaceae and is endemic to the south-west of Western Australia. It is a dense, intricately-branched shrub with glabrous branchlets, sessile, needle-shaped phyllodes continuous with the branches, spherical heads of golden yellow flowers, and curved to coiled pods.

== Description ==
Acacia chapmanii is a dense, intricately-branched shrub that typically grows to a height of 0.5–2 m (1 ft 8 in – 6 ft 7 in) and has glabrous branchlets. Its phyllodes are sessile, usually continuous with the branchlets, needle-shaped, 20–30 mm (0.79–1.18 in) long, 0.7–1 mm (0.028–0.039 in) wide, rigid and green to more or less glaucous with a sharp point on the tip. There are stipules 1–3 mm (0.039–0.118 in) long at the base of the phyllodes. The flowers are borne in a spherical head in axils on a peduncle 10–15 mm (0.39–0.59 in) long, each head 4–5 mm (0.16–0.20 in) in diameter with 14 to 27 golden yellow flowers. Flowering time depends on subspecies, and the pods are glabrous, strongly curved to coiled, up to 40 mm (1.6 in) long and 2.5–3.0 mm (0.098–0.118 in) wide with broadly elliptic seeds 2.5–3.0 mm (0.098–0.118 in) long, with a more or less club-shaped aril.

== Taxonomy ==
Acacia chapmanii was first formally described in 1999 by Richard Cowan and Bruce Maslin in the journal Nuytsia from specimens collected by Maslin "near Three Springs" in 1976. The specific epithet (chapmanii) honours Charles Chapman (1904 - 1989), "a farmer who lived near Winchester and became interested in the local flora".

In the same journal, Cowan and Maslin described of two subspecies of A. chapmanii, and the names are accepted by the Australian Plant Census:

- Acacia chapmanii subsp. australis R.S.Cowan & Maslin has stipules that are not spiny, phyllodes subterete to flat, and directed upwards, the ends gently turned downwards, heads with 24 to 27 flowers and flowering in August and September.
- Acacia chapmanii R.S.Cowan & Maslin subsp. chapmanii has spiny stipules, terete phyllodes, straight and arranged horizontally or turned down, heads with 14 to 19 flowers and flowering in September and October.

== Distribution and habitat ==
Acacia chapmanii subsp. australis grows in sand and sandy gravel in low heath in plains and swampy areas, as is only known from near Bolgart in the Avon Wheatbelt and Jarrah Forest bioregions. Subspecies chapmanii grows in sand, laterite and clay loam, sometimes on saline flats, in heath, scrub and disturbed areas, and is only known from near Three Springs and Marchagee in the Avon Wheatbelt and Geraldton Sandplains bioregions.

== Conservation status ==
Subspecies australis is listed as "Threatened Flora (Declared Rare Flora — Extant)" and subsp. chapmanii is listed as "Priority Two" by the Government of Western Australia Department of Biodiversity, Conservation and Attractions, meaning that it is poorly known and from one or a few locations.

== See also ==
- List of Acacia species
