= Acacia diallaga =

Conservation status
- Priority One — Poorly Known Taxa (DEC)

Scientific classification
- Kingdom: Plantae
- Clade: Tracheophytes
- Clade: Angiosperms
- Clade: Eudicots
- Clade: Rosids
- Order: Fabales
- Family: Fabaceae
- Subfamily: Caesalpinioideae
- Clade: Mimosoid clade
- Genus: Acacia
- Species: A. diallaga

Binomial name
- Acacia diallaga Maslin & Buscumb

Species of legume

Acacia diallaga is a species of flowering plant in the family Fabaceae and is endemic to inland Western Australia. It is a dense, spreading, much branched shrub with narrowly elliptic to oblong or lance-shaped phyllodes, spikes of light golden yellow flowers and narrowly oblong, thinly leathery pods.

== Description ==
Acacia diallaga is a dense, spreading, much-branched shrub that typically grows to a height of 0.5–1.5 m (1 ft 8 in – 4 ft 11 in) but can reach as high as 3 m (9.8 ft) and has glabrous branchlets. Its phyllodes are narrowly elliptic to oblong or lance-shaped and slightly asymmetric, straight or slightly down-turned, mostly 15–36 mm (0.59–1.42 in) long and 5–6 mm (0.20–0.24 in) with a sharp point on the end. The phyllodes are rigid, glabrous and glaucous, green or reddish-purple. The flowers are light golden yellow and borne in spikes 5–10 mm (0.20–0.39 in) long on a peduncle 2–4 mm (0.079–0.157 in) long with a bract at the base. Flowering time is difficult to determine but possibly responds opportunistically to rainfall. The pods are narrowly oblong, not or slightly constricted between the seeds, 25–55 mm (0.98–2.17 in) long and 4.0–4.5 mm (0.16–0.18 in) wide, thinly leathery, glabrous and light brown. The seeds are oblong, 3–4 mm (0.12–0.16 in) long and black with a creamy white aril.

== Taxonomy ==
Acacia diallaga was first formally described in 2008 by Bruce Maslin and Carrie Buscumb in the journal Nuytsia from specimens collected on Karara Station in September 2007. The specific epithet (diallaga) means 'interchange', referring to the change in colour of the plant's phyllodes, from more or less glaucous to purplish-red, when water becomes limiting during periods of drought.

== Distribution and habitat ==
This species of wattle is native to an area near Karara and Warriedar Stations to the east of Morawa where it grows on slopes or the crests of low rocky hills growing in skeletal soils in Allocasuarina or Acacia shrubland communities, in the Yalgoo bioregion of Western Australia.

== Conservation status ==
Acacia diallaga is listed as "Priority One" by the Government of Western Australia Department of Biodiversity, Conservation and Attractions, meaning that it is known from only one or a few locations where it is potentially at risk.

== See also ==
- List of Acacia species
