= Diapur =

Diapur Victoria
- Coordinates: 36°19′0″S 141°26′0″E
- Postcode(s): 3418
- Location: 350 km (217 mi) NW of Melbourne; 350 km (217 mi) SE of Adelaide; 17 km (11 mi) w of Nhill
- LGA(s): Shire of Hindmarsh
- State electorate(s): Lowan
- Federal division(s): Mallee

Diapur is a populated place in western Victoria, Australia situated about 350 km northwest of Melbourne. Diapur has an elevation of approximately 152m above sea level.

There is a wind farm three kilometers south by the same name, producing enough renewable energy to power 6,000 households.

Diapur once had a G.J. Coles variety store.

The locality once had a football side. It won a premiership in 1910 and last competed in 1930 in the Lowan Star Football Association.
