= Duplex soil =

The term "duplex" is used in Australia for soils with contrasting texture between soil horizons, although such soils are found in other parts of the world with strong seasonal wetting and drying climate (e.g. Mediterranean), where they are called calcic and chromic luvisols. Duplex soils are also termed "texture contrast soils".

With the term "duplex soil", Northcote defined a primary profile in his Factual Key classification. He described a group of texture contrast soils where the B horizon is dominated by a texture class one and a half (or more) finer than the A horizon. In addition, the clear to sharp change between the two horizons must occur within 0.1 m.

Texture in duplex soils is highly variable, with the topsoils ranging from coarse sand to clay loam and the subsoils from light to heavy clay. Some duplex soils are distinguished by the presence of an A2 bleached horizon, a character also used as a diagnostic key for the distinction between these types of soils.

The diagnostic properties used by Northcote for the definition of duplex soils consider only the soil texture (texture contrast and type of boundary between horizons A and B) and the colour is used for their differentiation (i.e. brown, red and yellow duplex soils). Under the Australian Soil Classification they can be included in different orders such as Podosols, Sodosol, Chromosols or Kurosols.
