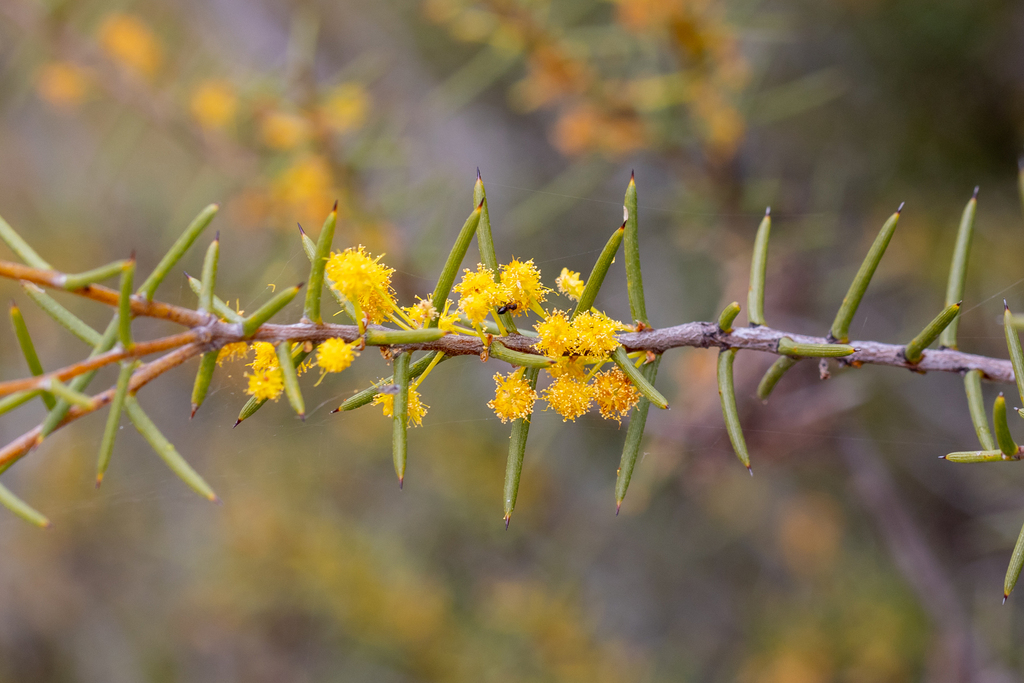
- Near Lake Gilles

Scientific classification
- Kingdom: Plantae
- Clade: Tracheophytes
- Clade: Angiosperms
- Clade: Eudicots
- Clade: Rosids
- Order: Fabales
- Family: Fabaceae
- Subfamily: Caesalpinioideae
- Clade: Mimosoid clade
- Genus: Acacia
- Species: A. nyssophylla

Binomial name
- Acacia nyssophylla F.Muell.
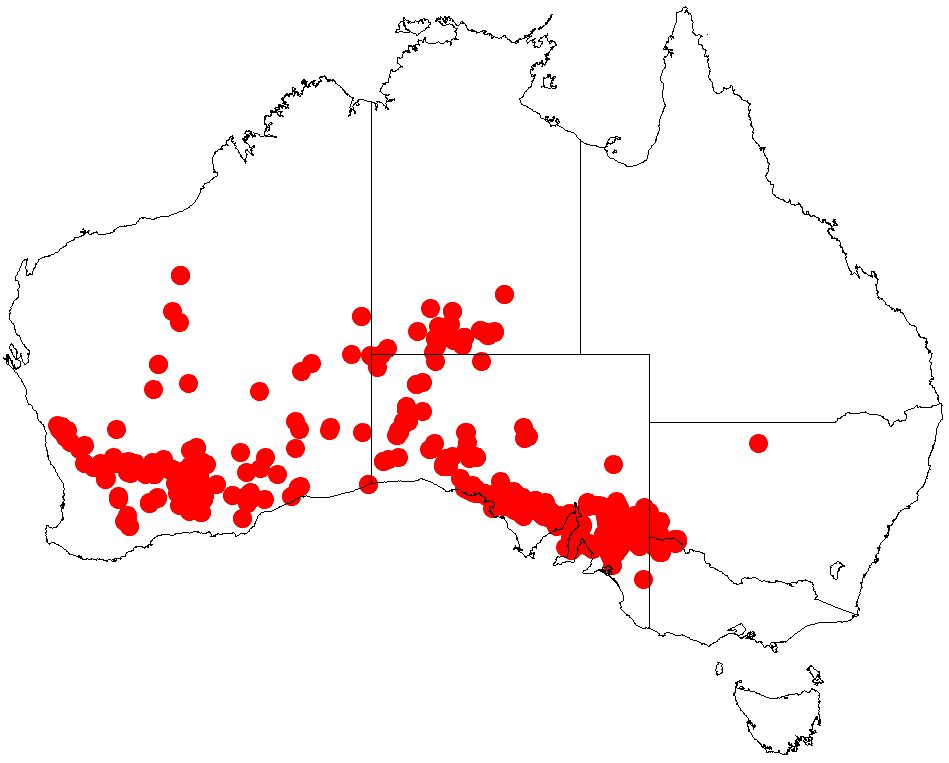
- Occurrence data from AVH

Synonyms
- Acacia colletioides var. nyssophylla (F.Muell.) Benth.; Acacia nyssophylla F.Muell. nom. inval.; Acacia periculosa S.Moore; Racosperma nyssophyllum (F.Muell.) Pedley

= Acacia nyssophylla =

Pin bush

Species of plant

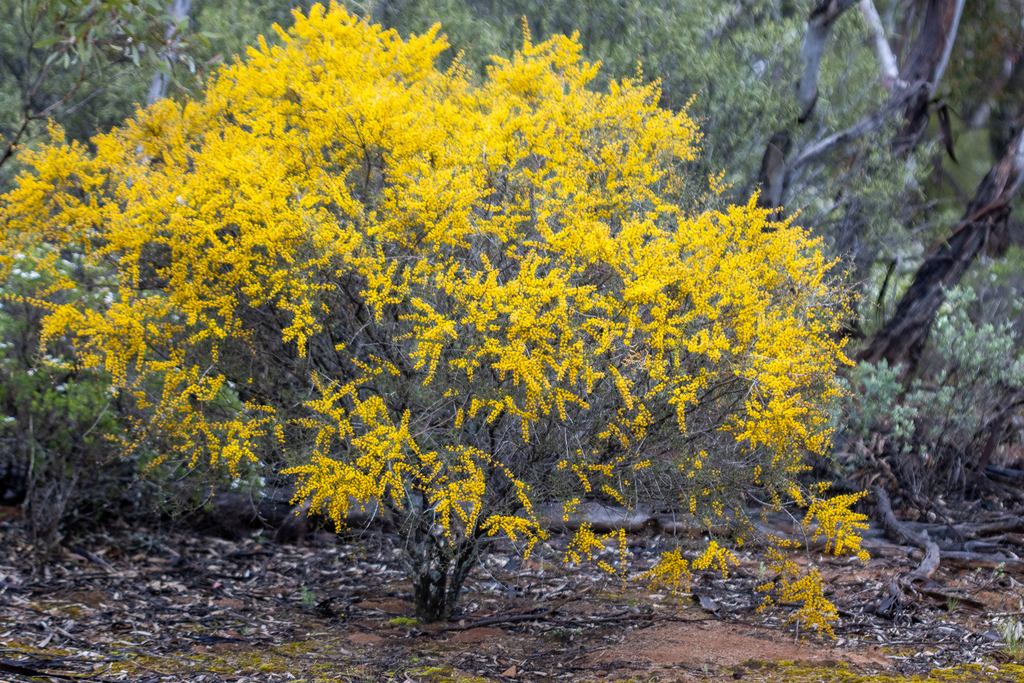
Habit in Clements Gap Conservation Park

Acacia nyssophylla, commonly known as pin bush, wait a while or spine bush, is a species of flowering plant in the family Fabaceae, and is endemic to mainland Australia. It is a dense, intricate shrub with sessile, subterete, firmly papery phyllodes, spherical heads of golden yellow flowers and linear, arched to coiled pods slightly constricted between the seeds.

== Description ==
Acacia nyssophylla is a dense intricate shrub, rarely a tree, that typically grows to a height of 6–3 m (19.7–9.8 ft) and has branchlets that are covered with soft hairs pressed against the surface at first, and are scarred where phyllodes have fallen. Its phyllodes are sessile, straight to shallowly curved, subterete to flattened, mostly 15–35 mm (0.59–1.38 in) wide, about 1.5 mm (0.059 in) wide, sharply pointed and rigid. There are about 20 rather close, somewhat obscure veins on the phyllodes and a gland 2–7 mm (0.079–0.276 in) above the base. The flowers are usually borne two spherical heads in axils on peduncles 3–10.5 mm (0.12–0.41 in), each head 3.5–6 mm (0.14–0.24 in) in diameter with 12 to 19 golden yellow flowers. Flowering mostly occurs from July to October, and the pods are linear, arched to coiled, 30–65 mm (1.2–2.6 in) long, 2–5 mm (0.079–0.197 in) wide, firmly papery and slightly constricted between the seeds. The seeds are lance-shaped to oblong, 4–5 mm (0.16–0.20 in) long with a large yellow or orange aril.

== Taxonomy ==
Acacia nyssophylla was first described in 1863 by Ferdinand von Mueller in his Fragmenta Phytographiae Australiae from specimens collected by Benjamin Babbage. The specific epithet is taken from the Greek nysso meaning 'to pierce' and phyllon meaning 'leaf' in reference to the stiff, sharply pointed phyllodes.

== Distribution and habitat ==
Pin bush occurs in all mainland states of Australia, including the Northern Territory, but not in Queensland. It commonly grows in open scrub or low woodland in loamy soils and is widely distributed in the Avon Wheatbelt, Central Ranges, Coolgardie, Gibson Desert, Great Sandy Desert, Great Victoria Desert, Little Sandy Desert, Mallee, Murchison, Nullarbor and Pilbara bioregions of Western Australia. It also occurs in the Central Ranges, Finke, Great Sandy Desert, Great Victoria Desert, MacDonnell Ranges, and Murray Darling Depression bioregions of the Northern Territory, and the Northern-Western, Lake-Eyre, Nullarbor, Gairdner-Torrens, Flinders Ranges, Eastern, Eyre Peninsula, Northern Lofty, Murray, and Yorke Peninsula regions of South Australia. It is also found in the far north-west of Victoria and rarely on the far south-western plains of New South Wales.

== See also ==
- List of Acacia species
