= Acacia asepala =

Conservation status
- Priority Two — Poorly Known Taxa (DEC)

- Near Threatened (IUCN 3.1)

Scientific classification
- Kingdom: Plantae
- Clade: Tracheophytes
- Clade: Angiosperms
- Clade: Eudicots
- Clade: Rosids
- Order: Fabales
- Family: Fabaceae
- Subfamily: Caesalpinioideae
- Clade: Mimosoid clade
- Genus: Acacia
- Species: A. asepala

Binomial name
- Acacia asepala Maslin

Synonyms
- Racosperma asepalum (Maslin) Pedley

Species of legume

Acacia asepala is a species of flowering plant in the family Fabaceae and is endemic to Western Australia. It is a diffuse, multi-branched shrub with reddish-brown branchlets, sharply-pointed, glabrous, needle-shaped phyllodes on short projections of the stems, spherical heads of bright, mid-golden yellow flowers, and narrowly oblong pods up to 40 mm (1.6 in) long.

== Description ==
Acacia asepala is diffuse and multi-branched shrub with reddish-brown branchlets and typically grows to a 0.5–1.5 m (1 ft 8 in – 4 ft 11 in) tall and 1.0–1.7 m (3 ft 3 in – 5 ft 7 in) wide. The phyllodes are glabrous, thickly needle-shaped, 10–25 mm (0.39–0.98 in) long and mostly 1 mm (0.039 in) wide with stipules about 0.2 mm (0.0079 in) long at the base. The flowers are arranged in two spherical heads in axils on a peduncles 2 mm (0.079 in) long, each head 4 mm (0.16 in) in diameter with about 10 mid-golden yellow flowers. Flowering has been observed beginning in August, and the pods are narrowly oblong to S-shaped or circular, 10–40 mm (0.39–1.57 in) long and 58 mm (2.3 in) wide.

== Taxonomy ==
Acacia asepala was first formally described in 1999 by the botanist Bruce Maslin in the journal Nuytsia from specimens he collected in Frank Hann National Park in 1985. The specific epithet (asepala) means 'without sepals'.

== Distribution and habitat ==
This species of Acacia grows in low eucalypt woodland in loam or sandy loam in three disjunct populations, south-east of Marvel Loch, near Forrestania and in the Frank Hann National Park in the Avon Wheatbelt, Coolgardie and Mallee bioregions of Western Australia.

== Conservation status ==
Acacia asepala is listed as "Priority Two" by the Government of Western Australia Department of Biodiversity, Conservation and Attractions, meaning that it is poorly known and from one or a few locations.

== See also ==
- List of Acacia species
