= Forrestania Airport =

- IATA: none; ICAO: YFTA

Summary
- Airport type: Private
- Operator: Western Areas N/L
- Location: Forrestania, Western Australia
- Elevation AMSL: 1,366 ft / 416 m
- Coordinates: 32°34′42″S 119°42′24″E

Map
- Location in Western Australia

Runways
Direction	Length		Surface
Direction	m	ft	Surface
15/33	1,530	5,020	Gravel
- Sources: Australian AIP and aerodrome chart

Forrestania Airport (ICAO: YFTA) is located at Forrestania in the Shire of Kondinin, Western Australia.

== See also ==
- List of airports in Western Australia
- Transport in Australia § Aviation
