= Lake Cronin =

Lake in Western Australia

- Location in Western Australia
- Interactive map of Lake Cronin
- Location: Wheatbelt, Western Australia
- Coordinates: 32°23′8″S 119°45′54″E
- Type: freshwater
- Primary inflows: Groundwater and surface runoff
- Basin countries: Australia
- Surface area: 3 ha (7.4 acres)
- Surface elevation: 387 m (1,270 ft)

Lake Cronin is an ephemeral freshwater lake in the Shire of Kondinin as part of the Great Western Woodlands in the Wheatbelt region of Western Australia located approximately 86 km (53 mi) east of the town of Hyden and about 370 km (230 mi) east south east of Perth. The lake is situated within the Lake Cronin Nature Reserve.

== Description ==
The lake is a semi-permanent freshwater lake located in goldfields close to the boundary of the eastern Wheatbelt near to where it meets Goldfields. It is one of the largest freshwater lakes in the region. Most lakes in the area are hypersaline but Lake Cronin has typical readings of 185 – 1300 mg/litre total dissolved solids making its water quite fresh. The lake occupies an area of 13 ha (32 acres) and is recognised as a nationally important wetland as is registered in the Directory of Important Wetlands in Australia. It is fringed by large areas of woodlands, mallee and shrublands that are more or less undisturbed but surrounded by lands cleared for agriculture, particularly to the west so that any original vegetation has been reduced to small scattered small remnants. The area's climate is semi-arid with hot summer and cool winters, but with reliable winter rainfall providing an estimated average of around 350 mm (14 in). The surrounding landforms are a mixture of breakaways, woodlands, sandplains and salt lakes in valley floors which drain internally. The surrounding hills and ranges are part of a large greenstone belt that runs from north to south and also includes isolated granite monoliths.

== Conservation area ==
An area of 1,050 ha (2,600 acres) surrounding the lake was gazetted as a formal Nature Reserve in 1980. It had been formally recognised for conservation since 1975 by the Environmental Protection Authority. The lake's wetland is surrounded by a catchment area that is almost completely intact and is listed as a nationally important wetland.

== Flora ==
The area surrounding Lake Cronin is particularly diverse with species of vegetation containing 24 vegetation types, including 16 species of plant that have conservation value. The area is composed of sandplain heath communities and low eucalypt woodlands and mallees with species such as Acacia asepala, Boronia westringioides, Melaleuca uncinata, Eremophila serpens and Eucalyptus exigua.

== Fauna ==
The lake is an important habitat for many species of waterbirds including; grey teals, pink-eared ducks, Australian shelducks and black-tailed native-hens. The varied fringing vegetation around the lake and wetlands also supports a variety of species including the striated pardalote, western rosella and blue-breasted fairy-wren. In surveys conducted in 1988, 90 species of birds were found in the area.

It is also home to a rich array of frogs with seven species being found here including; the summer breeding Neobatrachus centralis and Pseudophryne occidentalis and the winter breeding Helioporus albopunctatus, Lymnodynastes dorsalis and Neobatrachus pelobatoides. It is also the only known only locality of Denisonia atriceps, the rare elapid snake.

Fifteen species of mammals are also known to inhabit the area, including the white-tailed dunnart, Gilbert's dunnart, Mitchell's hopping mouse and the western pygmy possum.

== See also ==
- List of lakes of Australia § Western Australia
