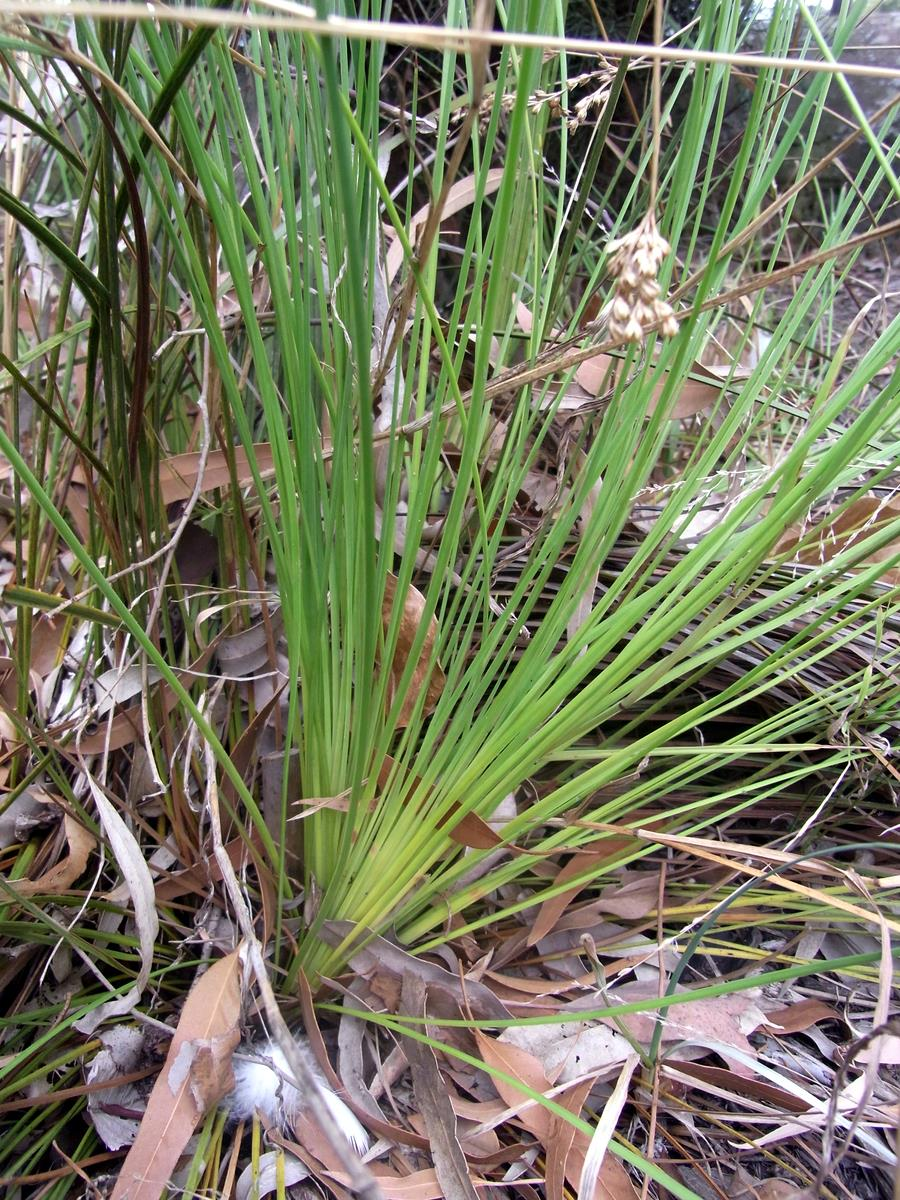

Scientific classification
- Kingdom: Plantae
- Clade: Tracheophytes
- Clade: Angiosperms
- Clade: Monocots
- Order: Asparagales
- Family: Asphodelaceae
- Subfamily: Xanthorrhoeoideae
- Genus: Xanthorrhoea
- Species: X. fulva

Binomial name
- Xanthorrhoea fulva (A.T.Lee) D.J.Bedford

= Xanthorrhoea fulva =

Species of flowering plant

Xanthorrhoea fulva is a species of grasstree of the genus Xanthorrhoea native to New South Wales and Queensland. It was previously regarded as a subspecies of Xanthorrhoea resinosa, but reclassified as a species in its own right in 1986.

Unlike some other grasstrees, it lacks a trunk, and instead grows from one or more underground stems. The leaves are blue-green or blue-grey and depressed in cross section. It flowers from August to October.

Xanthorrhoea fulva grows in wet sandy areas from Wyong on the New South Wales Central Coast north to around Rockhampton in Queensland.
