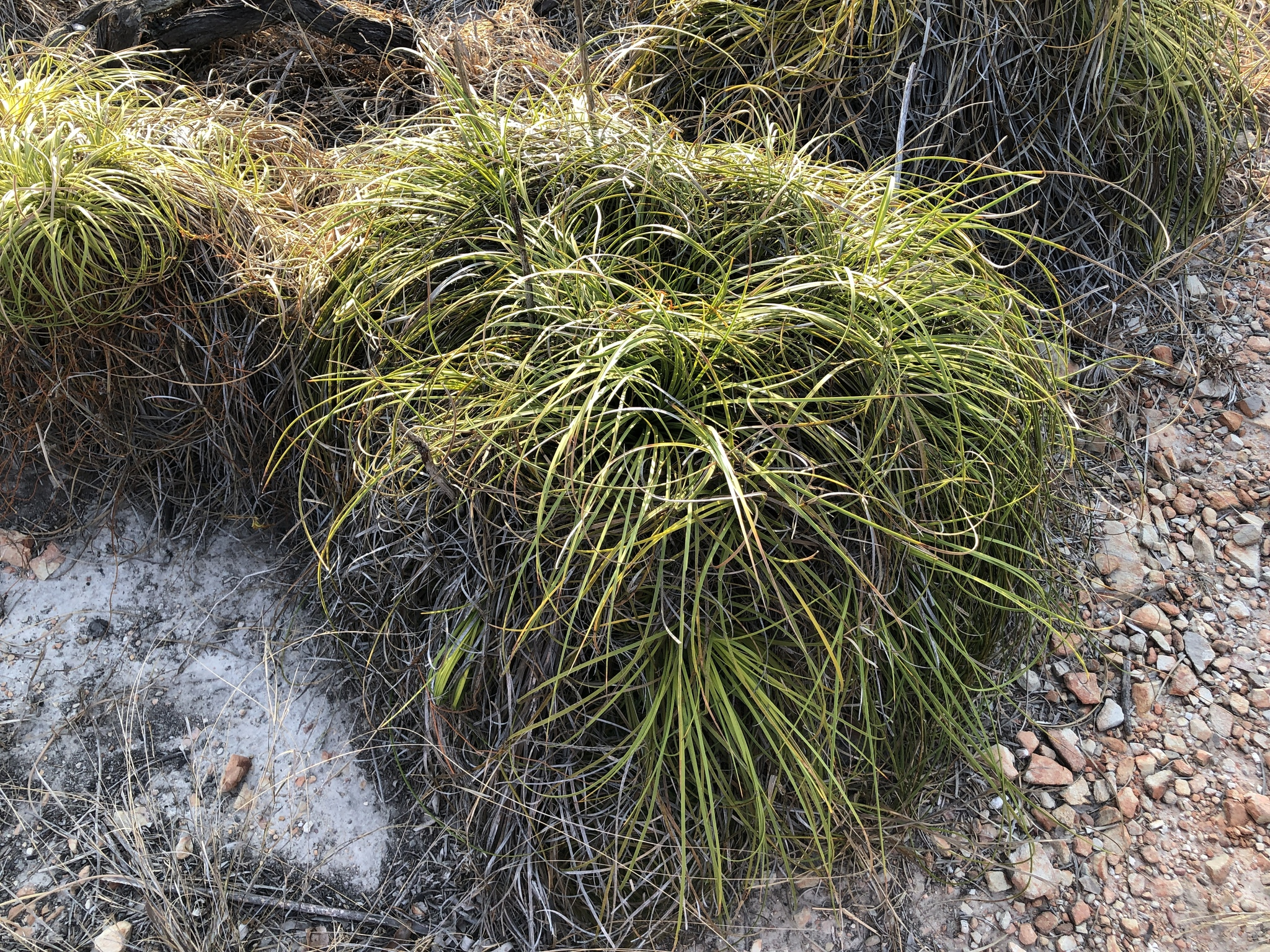

Scientific classification
- Kingdom: Plantae
- Clade: Tracheophytes
- Clade: Angiosperms
- Clade: Monocots
- Order: Asparagales
- Family: Asphodelaceae
- Subfamily: Xanthorrhoeoideae
- Genus: Xanthorrhoea
- Species: X. pumilio

Binomial name
- Xanthorrhoea pumilio R.Br.

= Xanthorrhoea pumilio =

Species of flowering plant

Xanthorrhoea pumilio is a species of grasstree in the family Asphodelaceae native to Queensland, Australia.

The perennial grass tree typically grows to a height of about 2 to 3 metres (7 to 10 ft) with the trunk reaching 0.6 metres (2 ft), scape of 0.5 to 2.1 metres (1.6 to 6.9 ft) and the flower spike to 0.4 metres (1 ft). It blooms between April and May. It can be hard to distinguish from small plants of Xanthorrhoea johnsonii and Xanthorrhoea latifolia.

The species is found along the east coast of Queensland from Cooktown south to Gladstone and as afar west as the Great Dividing Range.
