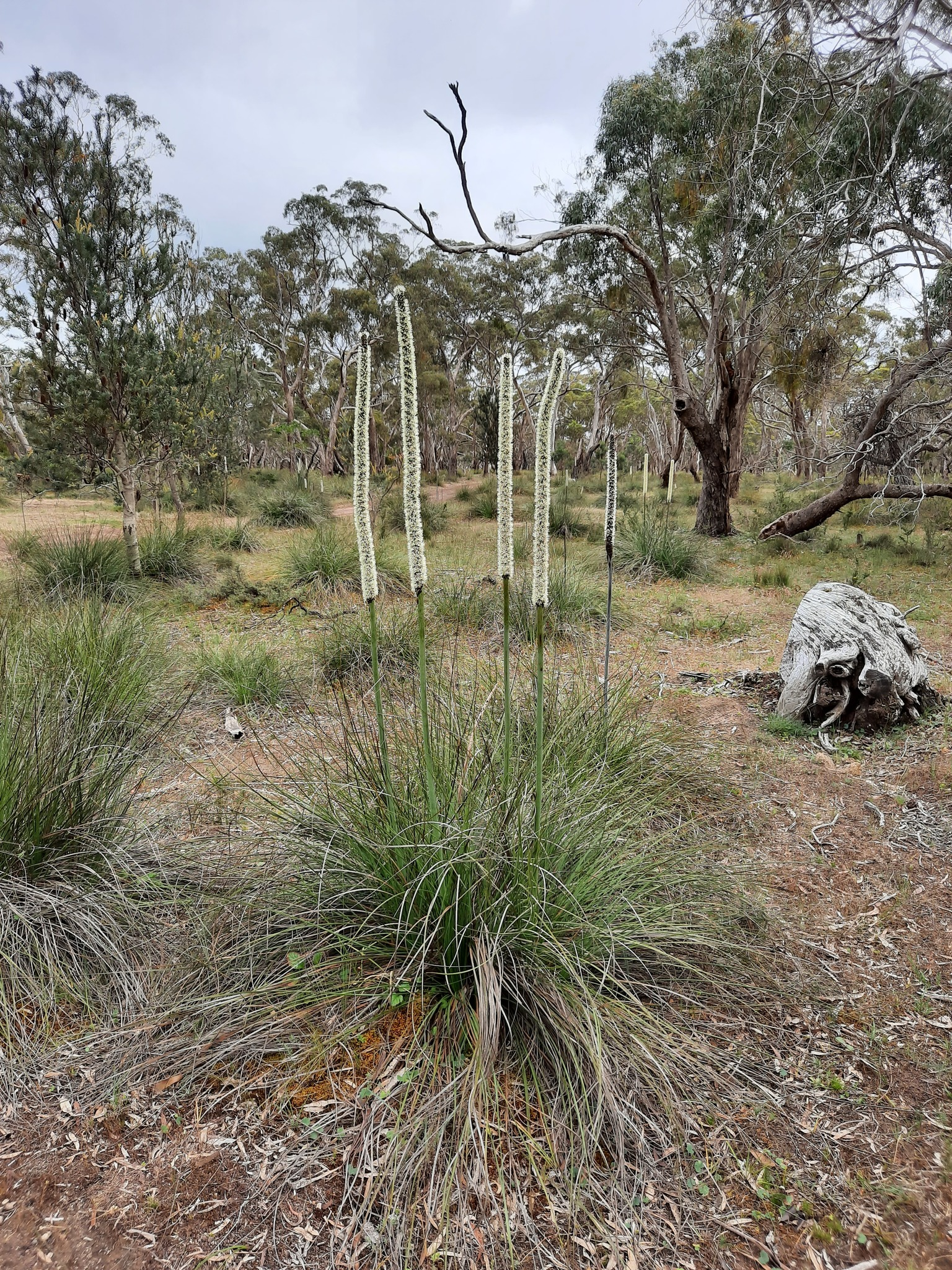

Scientific classification
- Kingdom: Plantae
- Clade: Tracheophytes
- Clade: Angiosperms
- Clade: Monocots
- Order: Asparagales
- Family: Asphodelaceae
- Subfamily: Xanthorrhoeoideae
- Genus: Xanthorrhoea
- Species: X. caespitosa

Binomial name
- Xanthorrhoea caespitosa D.J.Bedford

= Xanthorrhoea caespitosa =

Species of plant

Xanthorrhoea caespitosa, commonly known as sand-heath grasstree, is a species of grasstree of the genus Xanthorrhoea native to south-eastern Australia.

The perennial grass tree is found in the south east of South Australia and western Victoria where it is considered vulnerable.
