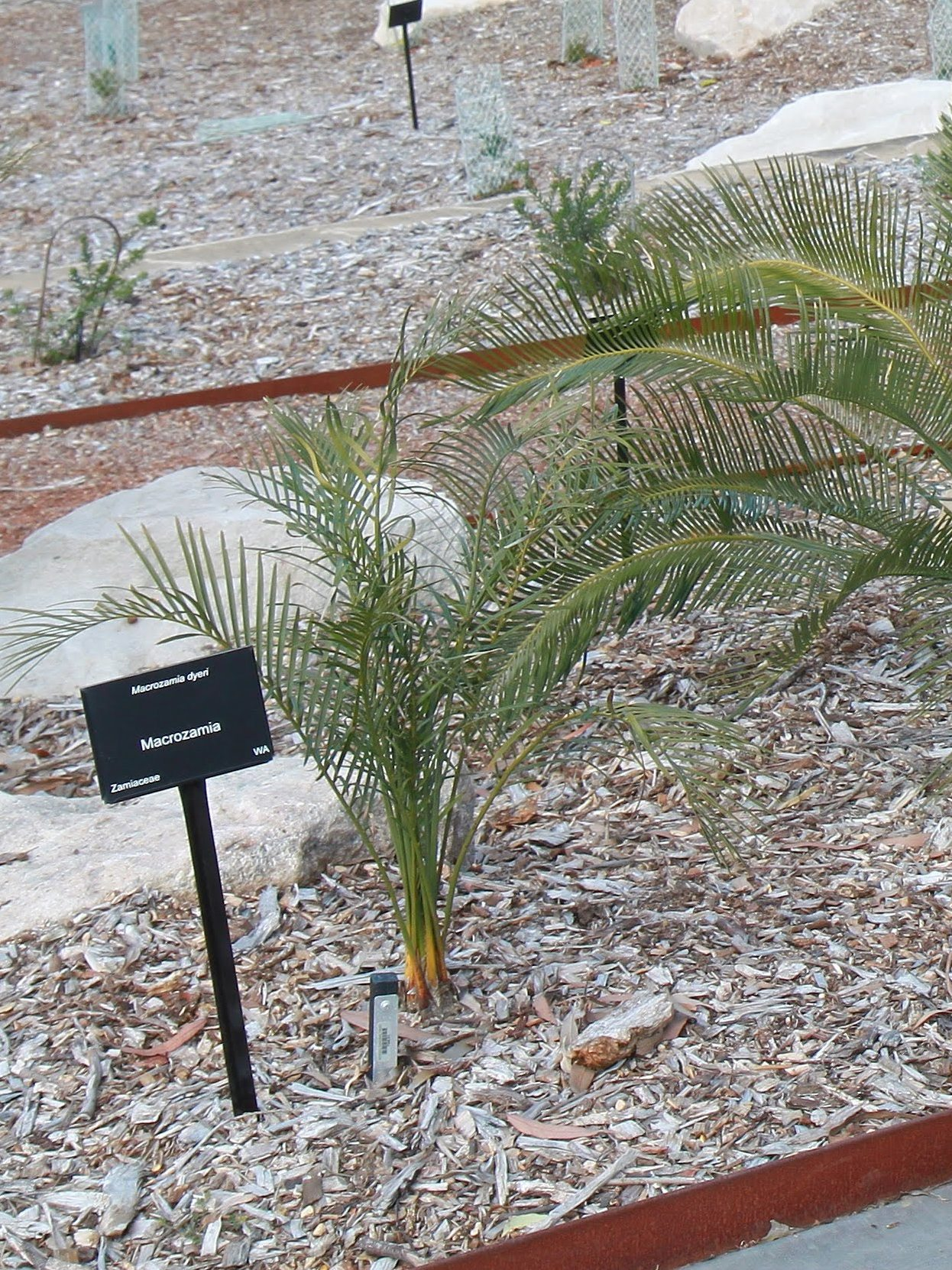

Conservation status
- Least Concern (IUCN 3.1)

Scientific classification
- Kingdom: Plantae
- Clade: Tracheophytes
- Clade: Gymnospermae
- Division: Cycadophyta
- Class: Cycadopsida
- Order: Cycadales
- Family: Zamiaceae
- Genus: Macrozamia
- Species: M. dyeri

Binomial name
- Macrozamia dyeri (F.Muell.) C.A.Gardner
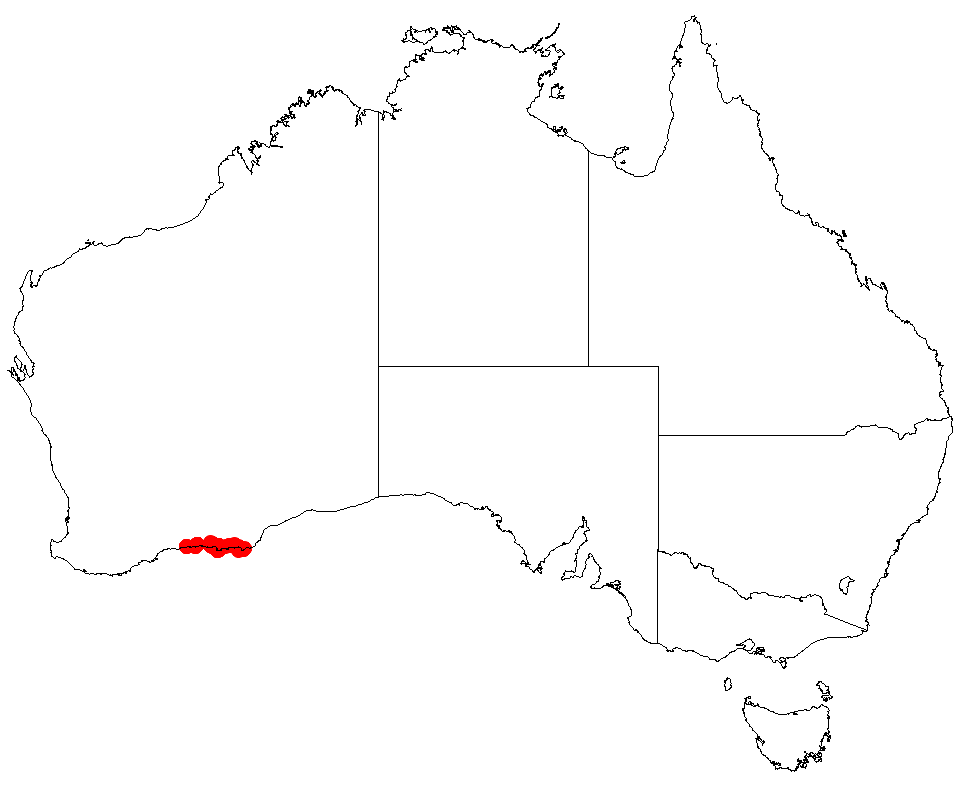
- Occurrence data from AVH

= Macrozamia dyeri =

Species of cycad

Macrozamia dyeri, known as djeeri, is a species of plant in the family Zamiaceae. It is endemic to Western Australia, occurring near Esperance. The seeds are consumable when prepared correctly and were an important resource to people of the region, but the plant is otherwise toxic to many species.

== Taxonomy ==
First described in 1885 by Ferdinand von Mueller as Encephalartos dyeri (Macrozamia dyeri), the current combination as a species of the Australian genus Macrozamia was published by Charles Gardner in 1930. The species name honors W. Thiselton Dyer, then assistant director of Kew Garden. The similar but differently pronounced word djeeri (recorded as Dji-ri-ji 'Zamia' by Symons) is a name for Macrozamia in the Nyungar language.

== Description ==
A cycad with a large above ground trunk, taking the form of a tree. The foliage is deeply keeled with wide leaflets, and the reproductive cones are narrow and extended.

== Ecology ==
The species is found in coastal heath on sand in which jarrah (Eucalyptus marginata) is absent, restricted in range to the eastern Recherche section of the Esperance Plains bioregion. The seeds of djeeri formed an important part of the human diet, the earliest record of this is the preparation of seed at a cave in Cape Le Grand national park dated at thirteen thousand years old. Investigation of the site revealed a mordak, the instrument used to detoxify the sarcotesta that surrounds the seeds. This seeds were placed in a depression lined with leaf bases of the plant paalaq, Xanthorrhoea platyphylla, another crucial resource in the local culture. The sarcotesta and seeds remains buried for several weeks to become detoxified and consumable, the food product, known as querning, still contains toxins at the centre of the seeds.

The distribution of the plant has been correlated to sites of long term human habitation, close to lakes or springs, and freshwater points at granitic outcrops of the kwongan, although the intervention of other consumers, birds and mammals, complicates a postulate that inadvertent or intentional cultivation is the primary factor in seed dispersal. Animals species involved in dispersal of the plant include birds such as the emu and mammalian species Trichosurus vulpecula, a common possum known locally as quumarl. The toxins macrozamin and cycasin are produced by cyanobacteria engaged in nitrogen fixing at their coralloid roots.
