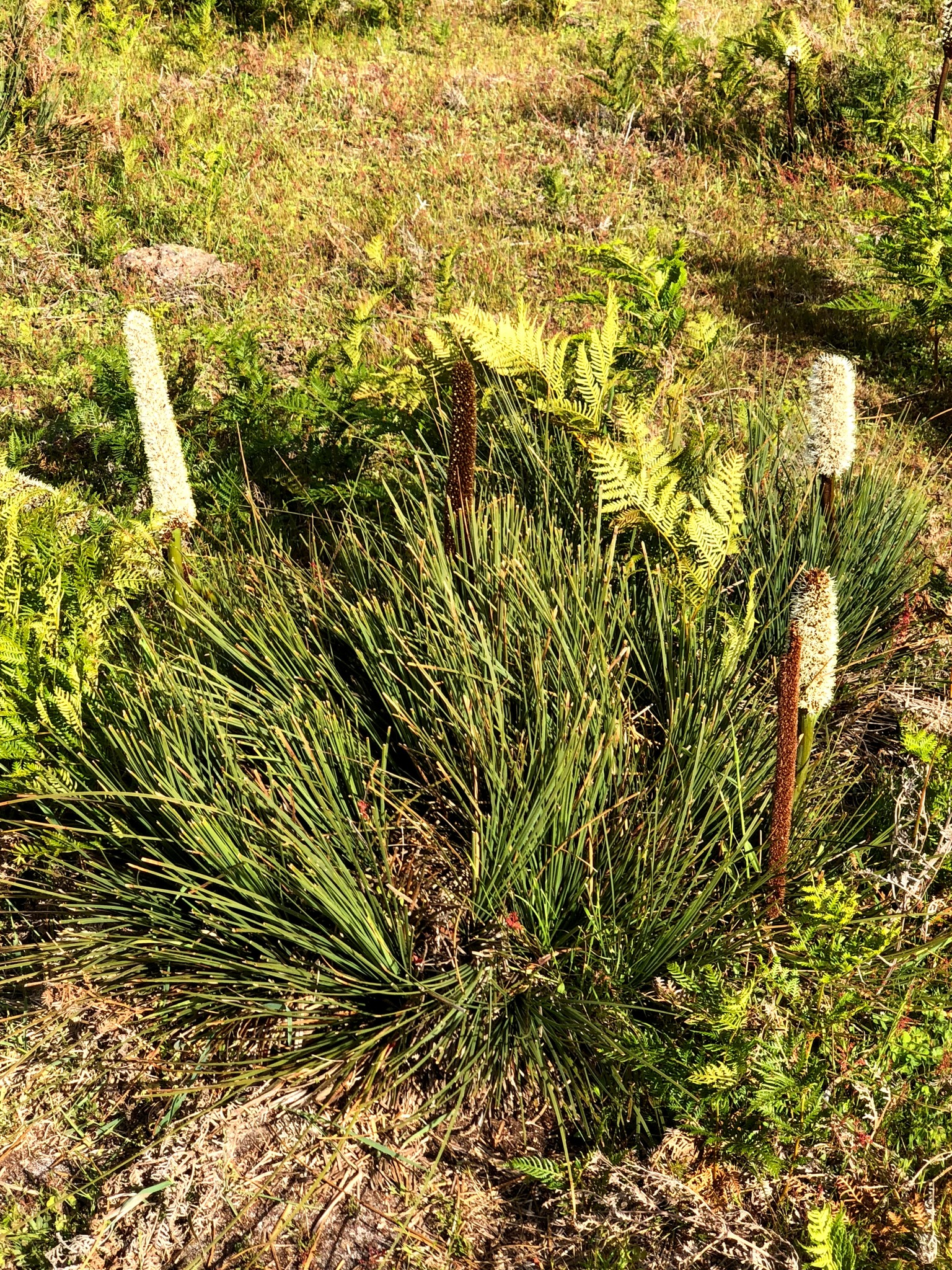

Conservation status
- Vulnerable (EPBC Act)

Scientific classification
- Kingdom: Plantae
- Clade: Tracheophytes
- Clade: Angiosperms
- Clade: Monocots
- Order: Asparagales
- Family: Asphodelaceae
- Subfamily: Xanthorrhoeoideae
- Genus: Xanthorrhoea
- Species: X. arenaria

Binomial name
- Xanthorrhoea arenaria D.J.Bedford

Synonyms
- Xanthorrhoea minor R.Br.

= Xanthorrhoea arenaria =

Sandy grasstree

Species of grasstree

Xanthorrhoea arenaria, commonly known as the sandy grasstree, is a species of grasstree endemic to Tasmania, Australia.

== Description ==
The sandy grasstree grows no discernible trunk, though it may have multiple crowns. The greyish to bluish-green leaves are 40–80 cm long and 2–3 mm wide. The flower spike is usually between a third and a half of the length of the scape, which is 8–11 mm in diameter). The small white flowers appear between June and January. The fruit is a capsule containing round, slightly flattened seeds.

== Distribution and habitat ==
The grasstree is endemic to Tasmania and is known only from a small number of sites between Bridport and Coles Bay in the north-east of the State. It grows on sandy heath soils.

== Conservation ==
The species is considered to be Vulnerable under both the Australian Environment Protection and Biodiversity Conservation Act 1999 and the Tasmanian Threatened Species Protection Act 1995. Threats include infection by Phytophthora cinnamomi, land clearance, inappropriate burning regimes and foliage harvesting.
