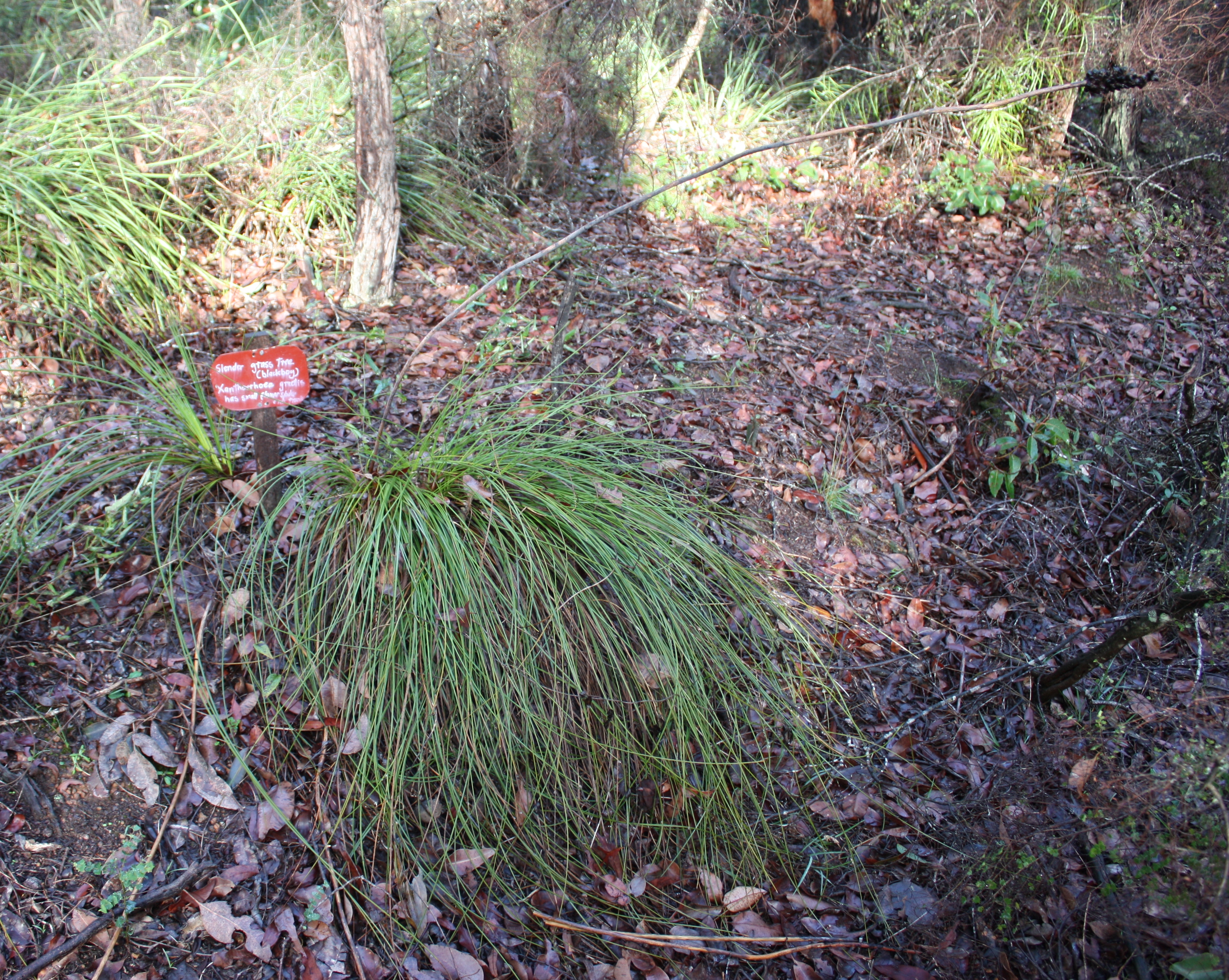
- Xanthorrhoea gracilis at the Bridgetown Jarrah Park

Scientific classification
- Kingdom: Plantae
- Clade: Tracheophytes
- Clade: Angiosperms
- Clade: Monocots
- Order: Asparagales
- Family: Asphodelaceae
- Subfamily: Xanthorrhoeoideae
- Genus: Xanthorrhoea
- Species: X. gracilis

Binomial name
- Xanthorrhoea gracilis Endl.

= Xanthorrhoea gracilis =

Species of flowering plant

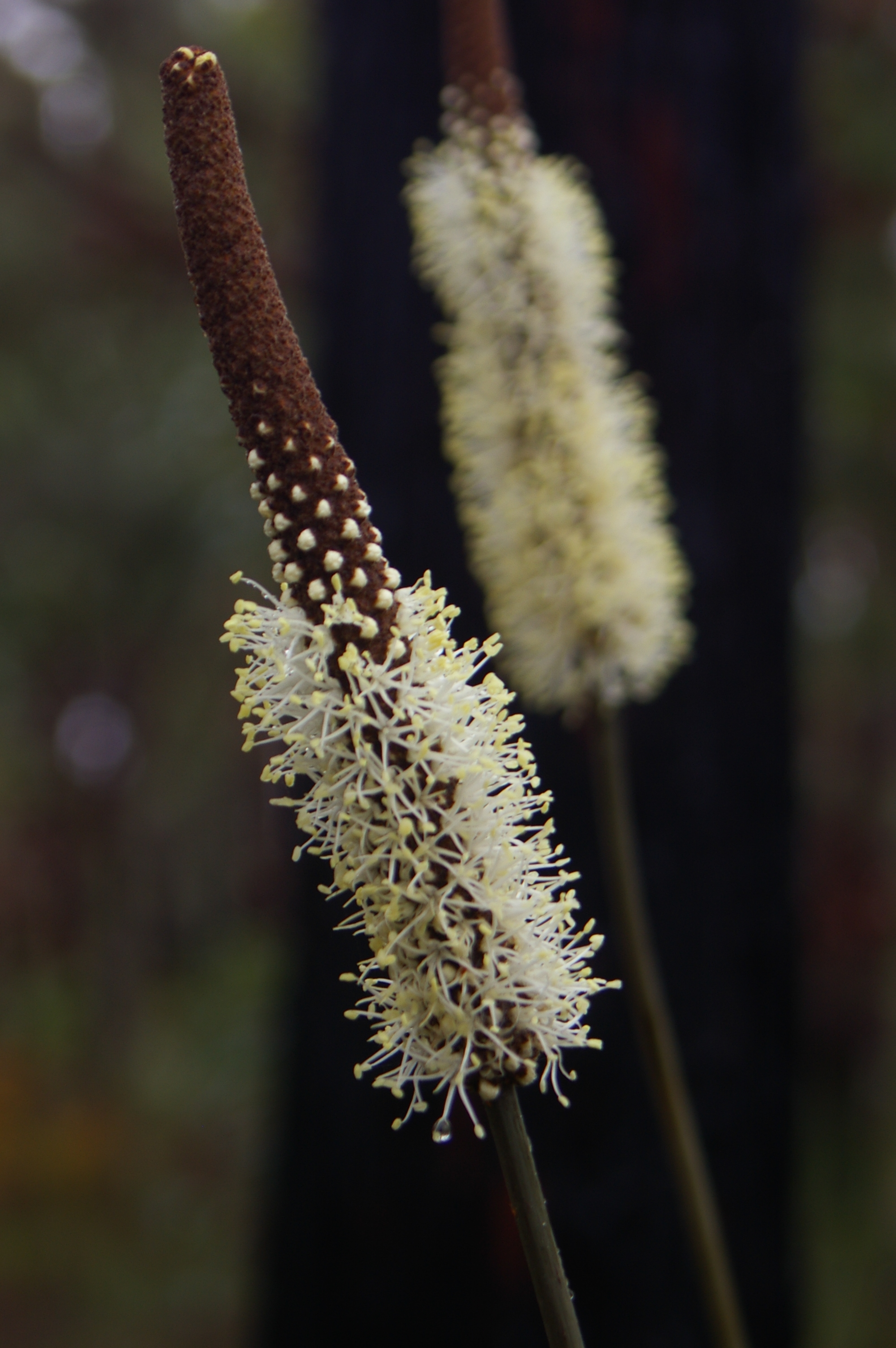
Xanthorrhoea gracilis flower spike

Xanthorrhoea gracilis, commonly known as the graceful grasstree, grassboy or mimidi, is a species of grasstree of the genus Xanthorrhoea native to Western Australia.

== Description ==
The tufted perennial grass tree typically grows to a height of 2 metres (7 ft) with no trunk, scape of 1.5 metres (4.9 ft) and the flower spike to 0.2 metres (1 ft). It blooms between October and January producing cream-white flowers. Although the plant has no visible stem, branches form on the stem underground. There can be a single crown or many which have a loosely upright to decumbent tuft appearance. The long slender green leaves are about 1.5 metres (4.9 ft) long, irregularly rounded depressed-obtrullate to depressed-cuneate in cross section, usually about 3 millimetres (0.12 in) wide and 1.5 mm (0.06 in) and are hairy at the base.

== Taxonomy ==
The species was first formally described by the botanist Stephan Endlicher in 1846 as part of Johann Georg Christian Lehmann's work Irideae. Plantae Preissianae. X. gracilis is a close relative of Xanthorrhoea macronema from eastern Australia.

== Distribution ==
It his found along the west coast in the Wheatbelt, Peel, South West and along the south coast into the Great Southern region of Western Australia. It extends from Carnamah in the north to Plantagenet in the south-east where it grows in sandy-loamy soils with lateritic gravel. It is mostly found as part of the jarrah forest ecosystem as part of the understorey. Canopy species include Eucalyptus marginata, E. calophylla and Allocasuarina fraseriana while substorey species include Banksia grandis, Persoonia elliptica, P. longifolia. Associated species in the understorey that are common include Anigozanthos humilis, Grevillea wilsonii and Hakea amplexicaulis.

== Cultivation ==
The plant can be grown from seed and prefers a position in full sun and is drought tolerant. It is susceptible to Phytophthora dieback. X. gracilis is able to resprout from subterranean buds following bushfire. Seedlings are rarely seen in the wild as a result of being grazed upon by the western gray kangaroo. The flowers are fragrant making the plant attractive to bees, butterflies and birds. It is suitable to grow in containers and is suitable for xeriscaping.
