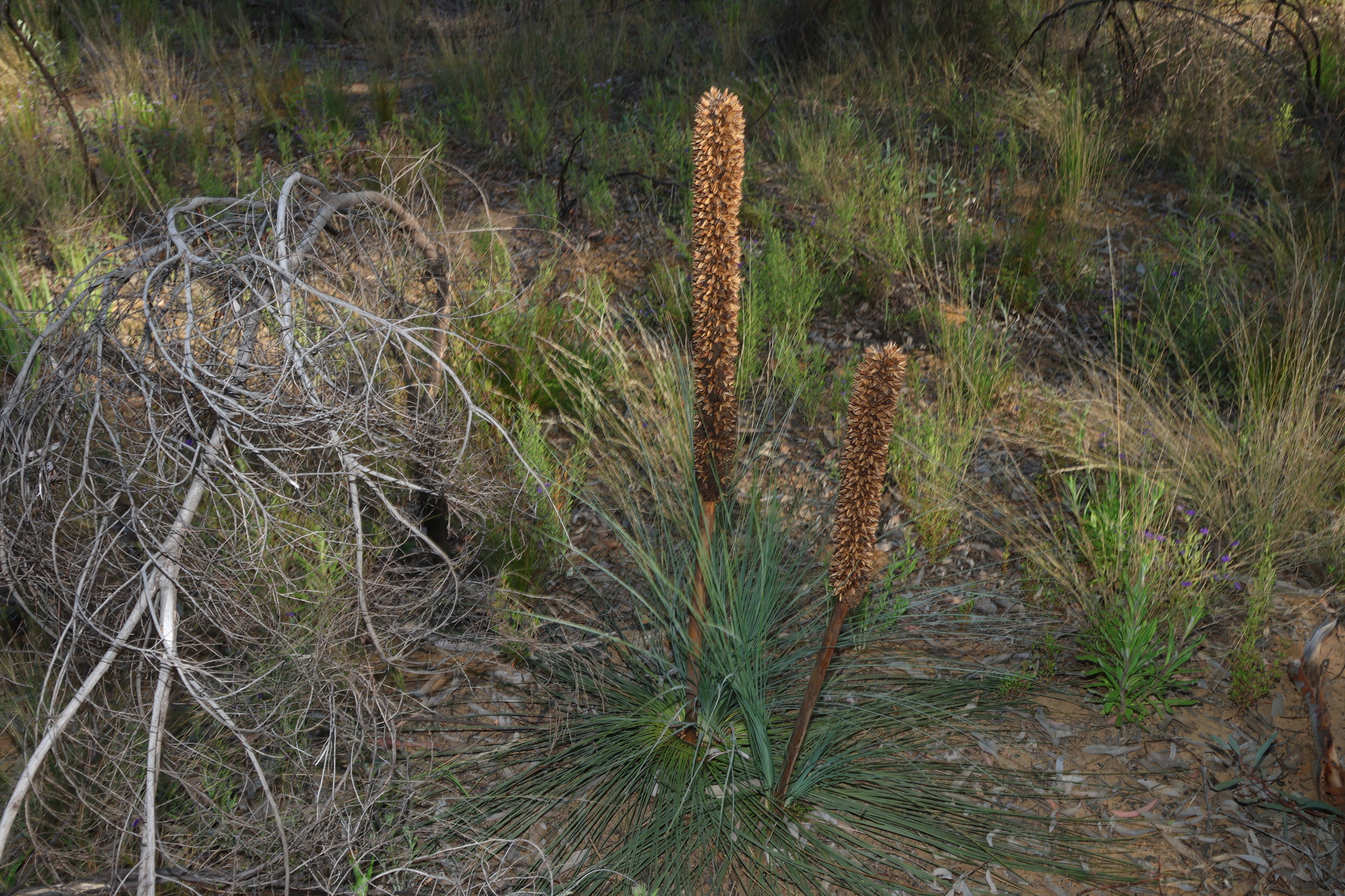

Scientific classification
- Kingdom: Plantae
- Clade: Tracheophytes
- Clade: Angiosperms
- Clade: Monocots
- Order: Asparagales
- Family: Asphodelaceae
- Subfamily: Xanthorrhoeoideae
- Genus: Xanthorrhoea
- Species: X. acaulis

Binomial name
- Xanthorrhoea acaulis (A.T.Lee) D.J.Bedford, 1986

Synonyms
- Xanthorrhoea australis subsp. acaulis A.T.Lee, 1972

= Xanthorrhoea acaulis =

Species of grasstree

Xanthorrhoea acaulis is a species of grasstree native to New South Wales, Australia.

== Description ==
X. acaulis generally has no trunk, or rarely one up to 30 cm in height, though it branches below ground and may have multiple crowns. The greyish to bluish-green leaves are about 1.8 mm wide and 1 mm thick. The scape is 25–45 cm long and 8–12 mm in diameter. The flower spike is 0.2–0.75 times as long as the scape, 10–25 cm long and 2.5–3.4 cm in diameter.

== Distribution and habitat ==
This grasstree occurs in New South Wales west of the Great Dividing Range, between Narrabri and Pilliga in the north and Grenfell in the south, mainly on sandy soils in dry sclerophyll forest.
