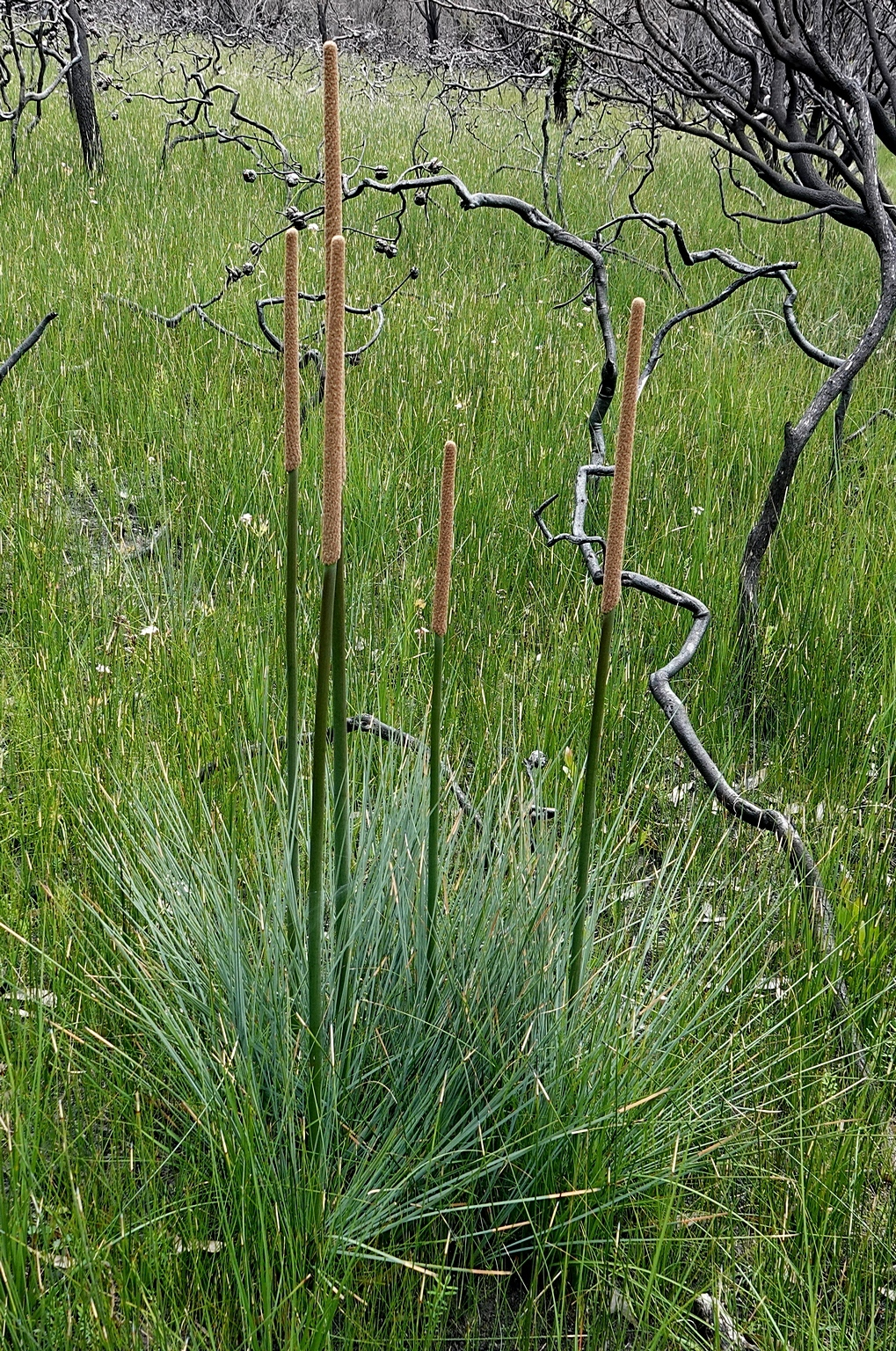

Scientific classification
- Kingdom: Plantae
- Clade: Tracheophytes
- Clade: Angiosperms
- Clade: Monocots
- Order: Asparagales
- Family: Asphodelaceae
- Subfamily: Xanthorrhoeoideae
- Genus: Xanthorrhoea
- Species: X. concava

Binomial name
- Xanthorrhoea concava (A.T.Lee) D.J.Bedford

Synonyms
- Xanthorrhoea resinosa subsp. concava A.T.Lee

= Xanthorrhoea concava =

Species of grasstree

Xanthorrhoea concava is a species of grasstree native to New South Wales, Australia.

== Description ==
X. concava has no discernible trunk, though it branches below ground and may have multiple crowns. The greyish to bluish-green leaves are about 3–6 mm (0.12–0.24 in) wide and 1.5–2 mm (0.059–0.079 in) thick. The scape is 0.5–2 m (1 ft 8 in – 6 ft 7 in) long and 1.5–3 cm (0.59–1.18 in) in diameter. The flower spike is half as long as the scape, 50–90 cm (20–35 in) long and 1.5–3 cm (0.59–1.18 in) in diameter.

== Distribution and habitat ==
This grasstree occurs in south-eastern New South Wales, from the Sydney region southwards to Eden, often on seasonally waterlogged sites.
