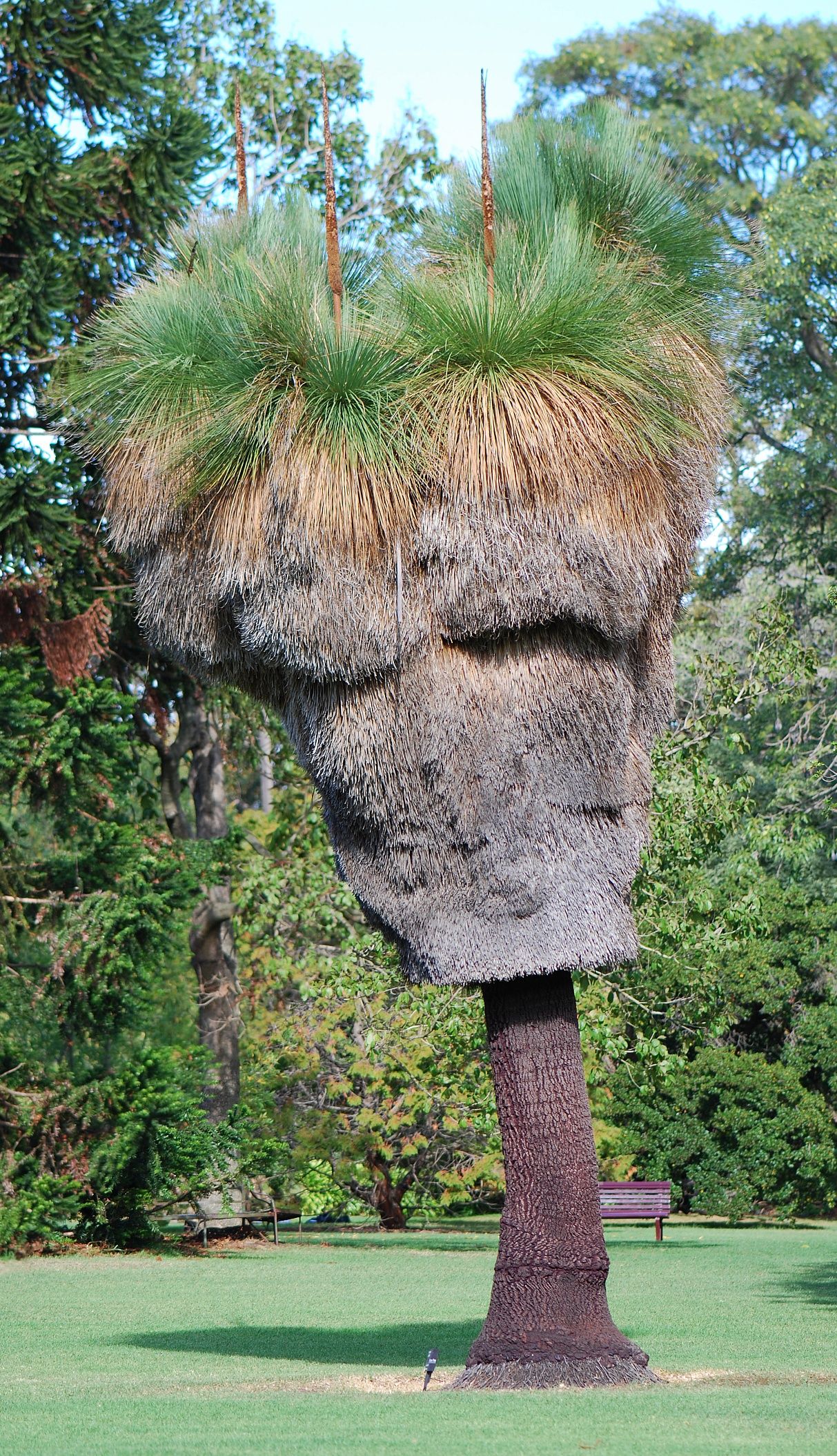
- Cultivated specimen in the Royal Botanic Gardens, Melbourne

Scientific classification
- Kingdom: Plantae
- Clade: Tracheophytes
- Clade: Angiosperms
- Clade: Monocots
- Order: Asparagales
- Family: Asphodelaceae
- Subfamily: Xanthorrhoeoideae
- Genus: Xanthorrhoea
- Species: X. malacophylla

Binomial name
- Xanthorrhoea malacophylla D.J.Bedford

= Xanthorrhoea malacophylla =

Species of flowering plant

Xanthorrhoea malacophylla is a species of grasstree of the genus Xanthorrhoea. It is endemic to New South Wales, Australia. Mature plants form a single or branched trunk that ranges between 2 and 6 metres in height. The grass-like leaves, which are usually around 3 mm wide, are distinguished from other species by their softness and sponginess. The flowers appear between May and September in scapes that are between 1.3 and 1.8 metres long.

The species was first formally described in 1986 based on plant material collected in 1964 from Queens Lake State Forest near the town of Kew, Australia. It occurs on steep hillsides in coastal ranges between Wyong and Casino.
