= Grass tree =

Grass tree, grass-tree or grasstree may refer to several plant species, including:

== Plants ==
- Dasylirion longissimum (family: Asparagaceae), known as the Mexican grass tree
- Dracophyllum (family: Ericaceae), a genus of about 100 species sometimes known as grass-trees
- Kingia australis (family: Dasypogonaceae), a monotypic genus from Southwest Australia
- Richea pandanifolia (family: Ericaceae), known as the giant grass tree
- Xanthorrhoea (family: Asphodelaceae), a genus of about 30 species endemic to Australia, commonly called grasstrees

== Places ==
- Grasstree railway station, New South Wales, Australia
- Grasstree, Queensland, a town in Australia
- Grasstree Beach, a locality in Queensland, Australia
