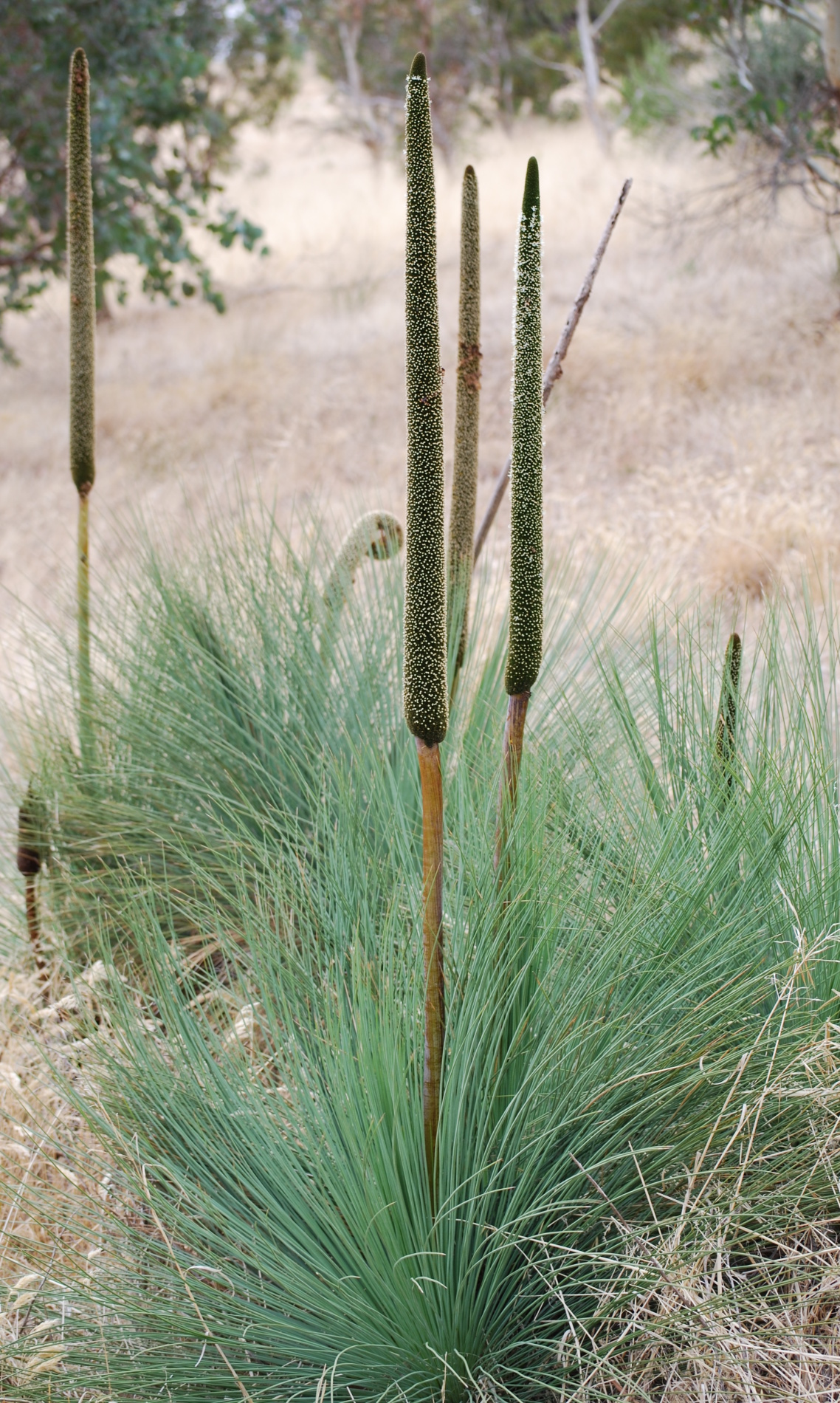
- X. semiplana

Scientific classification
- Kingdom: Plantae
- Clade: Tracheophytes
- Clade: Angiosperms
- Clade: Monocots
- Order: Asparagales
- Family: Asphodelaceae
- Subfamily: Xanthorrhoeoideae
- Genus: Xanthorrhoea; Sol. ex Sm.

Species
- 28 species

Synonyms
- Acoroides Sol. ex Kite, not validly published

= Xanthorrhoea =

Genus of flowering plants

Xanthorrhoea (/zænθoʊˈriːə/) is a genus of about 30 species of succulent flowering plants in the family Asphodelaceae. They are endemic to Australia. Common names for the plants include grasstree, grass gum-tree (for resin-yielding species), kangaroo tail, balga (Western Australia), yakka (South Australia), yamina (Tasmania, from the palawa kani language), and black boy (or "blackboy"). The most common species is Xanthorrhoea australis, and some of these names are applied specifically to this species.

== Description ==
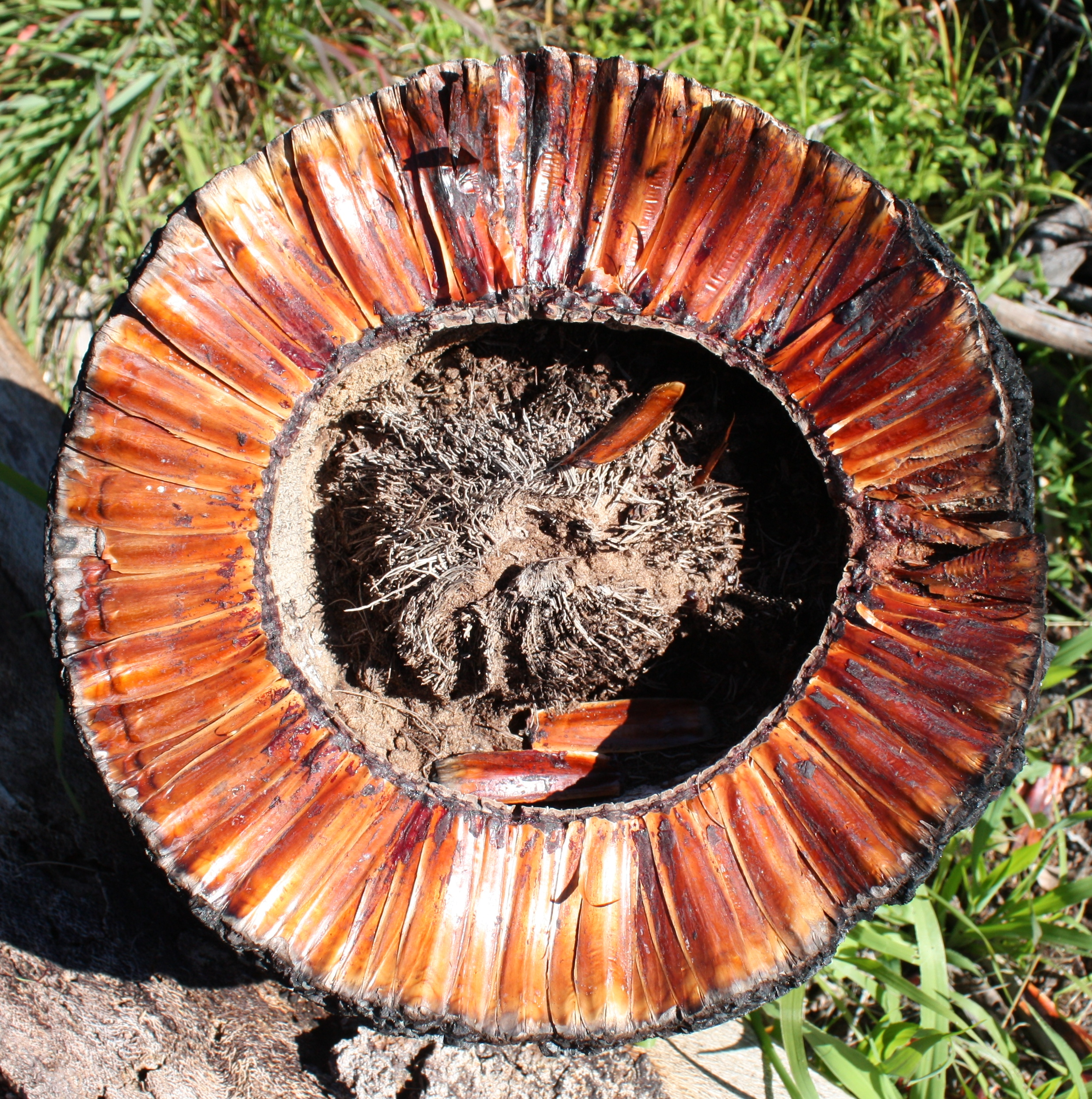
The dead "trunk" of Xanthorrhoea is a hollow ring of accumulated leaf bases. Nutrient transport was via vascular bundles that run down the centre. The parenchymatous tissue is decomposed.

All species in the genus are perennials and have a secondary thickening meristem in the stem. Many, but not all, species develop an above ground stem. The stem may take up to twenty years to emerge. Plants begin as a crown of rigid grass-like leaves, the caudex slowly growing beneath. The main stem or branches continue to develop beneath the crown. This is rough-surfaced, built from accumulated leaf-bases around the secondarily thickened trunk. The trunk is sometimes unbranched, some species will branch if the growing point is damaged, and others naturally grow numerous branches.

Flowers are borne on a long spike above a bare section called a scape; the total length can be over three to four metres long in some species. Flowering occurs in a distinct period, which varies for each species, and often stimulated by bushfire. Fires will burn the leaves and blacken the trunk, but the plant survives as the dead leaves around the stem serve as insulation against the heat of a wildfire.

The rate of growth of Xanthorrhoea is slow. Some species grow slowly (0.8–6 centimetres or 0.31–2.36 inches in height per year), but increase their rate of growth in response to season and rainfall. After the initial establishment phase, the rate of growth varies widely from species to species. Thus, while a five-metre-tall (16 ft) member of the fastest-growing Xanthorrhoea may be 200 years old, a member of a more slowly growing species of equal height may have aged to 600 years.

== Systematics ==
=== Taxonomy ===
Xanthorrhoea is part of the family Asphodelaceae, containing related genera such as Aloe, Alstroemeria, Gasteria, Haworthia and Hemerocallis (to name a few), but is placed within its own monotypic subfamily, the Xanthorrhoeoideae. The Xanthorrhoeoideae are monocots, part of the greater order of Asparagales.

A reference to its yellow resin, Xanthorrhoea literally means "yellow-flow" in Ancient Greek. Smith named it, in 1798, from xanthos ('yellow, golden') and rhœa ('flowing, flow'). The invalid Acoroides ('Acorus-like') was a temporary designation in Solander's manuscript from his voyage with Cook, originally not meant for publication.

Kingia and Dasypogon are unrelated Australian plants with a similar growth habit to Xanthorrhoea. Both genera have, at times, been confused with xanthorrhoeas and misnamed as "grasstrees". Some plant classification systems, such as Cronquist, have included a wide range of other genera in the same family as Xanthorrhoea. However, future anatomical and phylogenetic research supported the views of Dahlgren, whom regarded Xanthorrhoea as the sole taxon of the family Xanthorrhoeaceae sensu stricto, which is now treated as a subfamily, Xanthorrhoeoideae.

=== Names ===
Common names for Xanthorrhoea include grasstree, grass gum-tree (for its resin-yielding species), and kangaroo tail. The name grasstree is applied to many other plants. They are also known as balga grass plants, which derives from the word balga in the Noongar language of south-west of Western Australia, particularly for X. preissii. Its meaning is "black boy" or "blackboy", a name which was applied to the plant for many years. Some thought that Aboriginal peoples used the name balga because the trunk blackened after a bushfire resembles a child-like black figure. The name is now seen as racist, and Xanthorrhoea are more commonly known as grass tree. However a 2015 report written by Aboriginal Tasmanian authors, who refer to the plant as yamina, says "yamina forest on lungtalanana is important to the community. yamina are also commonly known as black boys. They are called this because the plant has a thick black trunk".

In South Australia, Xanthorrhoea is commonly known as yakka, also spelled yacca and yacka, a name probably from the Kaurna language (Yakko, or alternatively Kurru). The Ngarrindjeri name is Bukkup.

Some of the above names are applied specifically to Xanthorrhoea australis, the most common species.

== Diversity and distribution ==
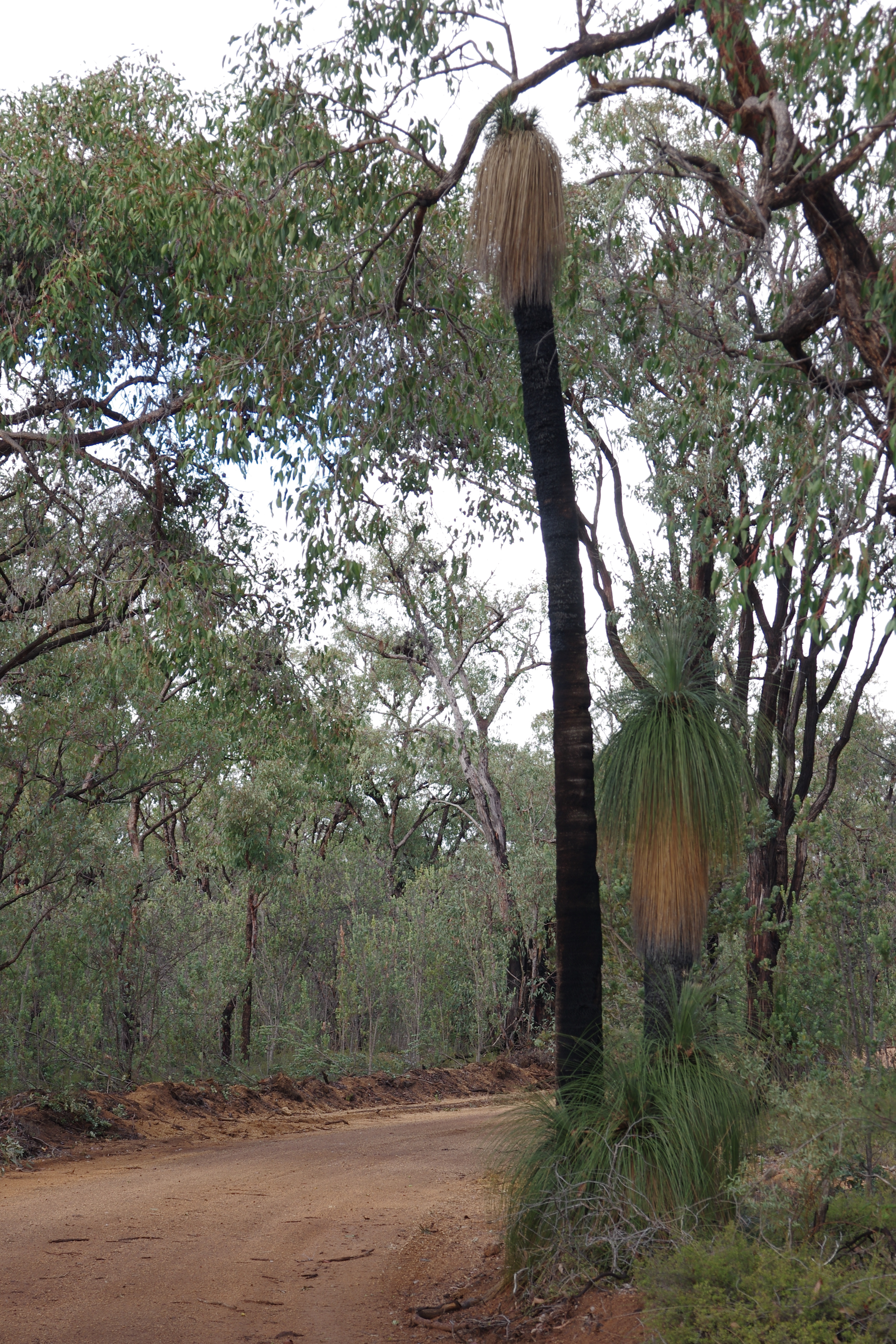
A five-metre-tall (16 ft) Xanthorrhea drummondii in the Avon Valley National Park, Western Australia

The genus is endemic to Australia, occurring in all national states and territories. Some species have a restricted range, others are widely distributed. According to the World Checklist of Selected Plant Families, as of September 2014 the following species are accepted:

List of Xanthorrhea species in Australia
Image	Name	Authority	States and Territories						
Image	Name	Authority	NSW	QLD	VIC	TAS	SA	WA	NT
	X. acanthostachya	D.J.Bedford	·	·	·	·	·	Y	·
	X. acaulis	(A.T.Lee) D.J.Bedford	Y	·	·	·	·	·	·
	X. arborea	R.Br.	Y	·	·	·	·	·	·
	X. arenaria	D.J.Bedford	·	·	·	Y	·	·	·
	X. australis	R.Br.	Y	·	Y	Y	Y	·	·
	X. bracteata	R.Br.	·	·	·	Y	·	·	·
	X. brevistyla	D.A.Herb.	·	·	·	·	·	Y	·
	X. brunonis	Endl. in J.G.C.Lehmann	·	·	·	·	·	Y	·
	X. caespitosa	D.J.Bedford	·	·	·	·	Y	·	·
	X. concava	(A.T.Lee) D.J.Bedford	Y	·	·	·	·	·	·
	X. drummondii	Harv.	·	·	·	·	·	Y	·
	X. fulva	(A.T.Lee) D.J.Bedford	Y	Y	·	·	·	·	·
	X. glauca	D.J.Bedford	Y	Y	Y	·	·	·	·
	X. gracilis	Endl. in J.G.C.Lehmann	·	·	·	·	·	Y	·
	X. johnsonii	A.T.Lee	Y	Y	·	·	·	·	·
	X. latifolia	(A.T.Lee) D.J.Bedford	Y	Y	·	·	·	·	·
	X. macronema	F.Muell. ex Benth.	Y	Y, Fraser Island	·	·	·	·	·
	X. malacophylla	D.J.Bedford	Y	·	·	·	·	·	·
	X. media	R.Br.	Y	·	·	·	·	·	·
	X. minor	R.Br.	Y	·	Y	·	Y	·	·
	X. nana	D.A.Herb.	·	·	·	·	·	Y	·
	X. platyphylla	D.J.Bedford	·	·	·	·	·	Y	·
	X. preissii (syn. X. pecoris F.Muell.)	Endl. in J.G.C.Lehmann	·	·	·	·	·	Y	·
	X. pumilio	R.Br.	·	Y	·	·	·	·	·
	X. quadrangulata	F.Muell.	·	·	·	·	Y	·	·
	X. resinosa (syn. X. hastilis)	Pers.	Y	·	Y	·	·	·	·
	X. semiplana	F.Muell.	·	·	Y	·	Y	·	·
	X. thorntonii	Tate	·	·	·	·	Y	Y	Y

== Habitat ==
Grasstrees grow in coastal heaths, and wet and dry forests of Australia. They are drought and frost tolerant. The grass tree mainly occurs in soils that are very free draining and consequently low in nutrients. It survives in the poorest soils, with a shallow root system, enabling it to easily access nutrients from decaying litter, while storing all the food reserves in its stem.

== Ecology ==
The grass tree has developed adaptations that help it better suit the environment where it occurs. If a fire breaks out, the grass tree has a special physiological adaptation called thermal insulation that helps protect the plant. The grass tree holds its thick, dead leaves around its stem which serves as insulation, and helps to protect the plant against the heat of the fire.

They need fire to clear away dead leaves and promote flowering, as these slow-growing trees were among the first flowering plants to evolve. Grass trees have developed a structural adaptation which helps the grass tree take advantage of soil fertilized with ash after fire, producing a flowering stalk in the aftermath.

The grass tree forms a symbiotic mycorrhizal relationship with fungi deep in its root system, wherein fungi live in a mutually beneficial relationship with the grass tree roots. The fungus increases the tree root's access to water and nutrients and therefore increases tree growth especially in poor conditions. The leaves of the grass tree are hosts to another fungi, Pseudodactylaria xanthorrhoeae.

The grass tree also suffers from a condition known as phytophthora dieback. Phytophthora cinnamomi is a discrete soil borne pathogen that attacks and destroys vascular root systems, causing hosts to perish through lack of nutrients and water. It is spread through infected plants and the movement of contaminated soil and gravel.

== Cultivation ==
Xanthorrhoea may be cultivated, as seed is easily collected and germinated. While they do grow slowly, quite attractive plants with short trunks (10 centimetres or 3.9 inches) and leaf crowns up to 1.5 metres or 4 feet 11 inches (to the top of the leaves) can be achieved in 10 years. The slow growth rate means that it can take 30 years to achieve a specimen with a significant trunk. Most Xanthorrhoea sold in nurseries are established plants taken from bushland. Nurseries charge high prices for the plants. However, there is a very low survival rate for nursery-purchased plants (mainly due to over watering), which may take several years to die. The most successful examples of transplanting have been where a substantial amount of soil, greater than one cubic metre (35 ft^{3}), has been taken with the plants.

Xanthorrhoea is an iconic plant that epitomizes the Australian bush in its ability to live in poor nutrient soils and respond to wildfire.

Commonly-grown species for the garden include Xanthorrhoea australis, X. malacophylla, and X. preissii.

== Uses ==
Xanthorrhoea is important to the Aboriginal peoples. It is a highly-valued resource with many uses. The flowering spike may be utilised as the lightweight handle of a composite spear with a hardwood sharp shaft inserted into the end. It is also soaked in water and the nectar from the flowers gives a sweet-tasting drink.

In the bush the flowers could reveal directions, since flowers on the warmer, sunnier side – usually north – of the spike often open before the flowers on the cooler side facing away from the sun.

The resin from Xanthorrhoea plants is used in spear-making and is an invaluable adhesive for Aboriginal people, often used to patch up leaky coolamons (water containers) and even yidaki (didgeridoos). The dried flower stalk scape was also used to generate fire by the hand drill friction method.

On the Tasmanian island of lungtalanana, Aboriginal people use the leaves for weaving.

Resin collected from the plant was used in Australia until the mid-twentieth century for the following purposes:

- Burnt as an incense in churches
- A base component for a varnish used on furniture and in dwellings
- A polish and a coating used on metal surfaces including stoves, tin cans used for storing meat, and brass instruments
- A component used in industrial processes, such as sizing paper, as well as making soap, perfumes, and early gramophone records

== Gallery ==
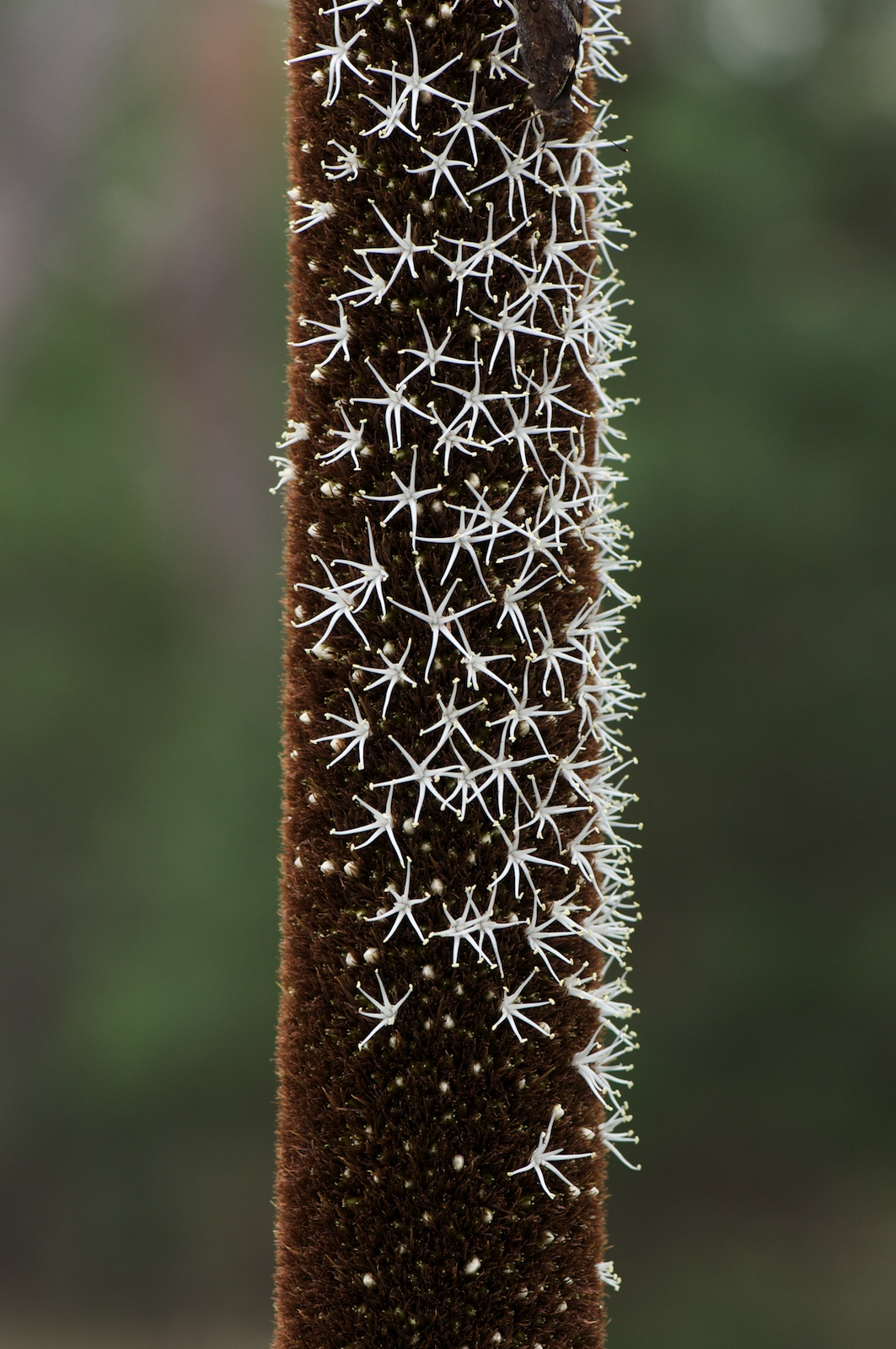
X. australis flower spike, flowering

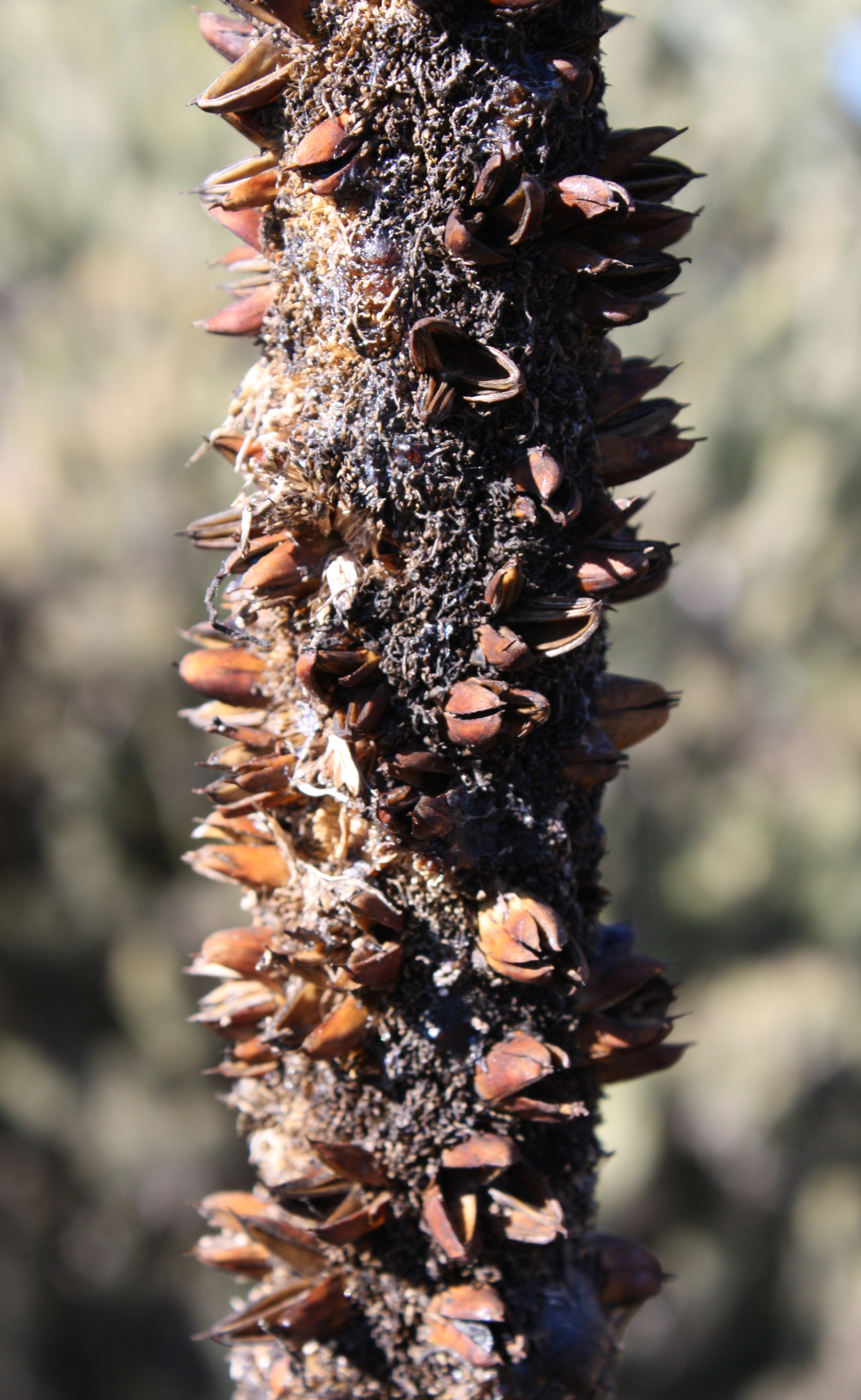
X. preissii flower spike, after fruiting
