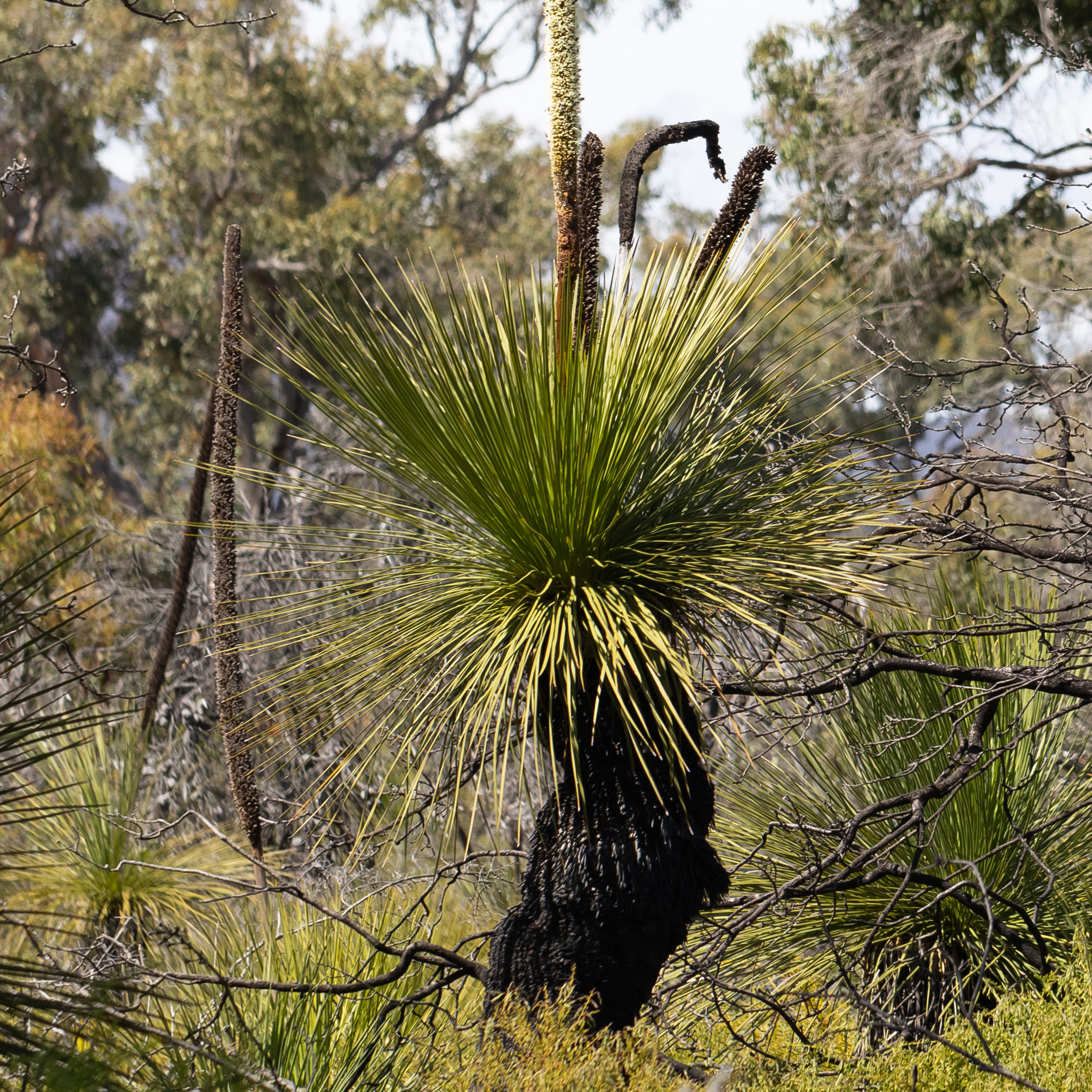

Scientific classification
- Kingdom: Plantae
- Clade: Tracheophytes
- Clade: Angiosperms
- Clade: Monocots
- Order: Asparagales
- Family: Asphodelaceae
- Subfamily: Xanthorrhoeoideae
- Genus: Xanthorrhoea
- Species: X. platyphylla

Binomial name
- Xanthorrhoea platyphylla D.J.Bedford

= Xanthorrhoea platyphylla =

Species of flowering plant

Xanthorrhoea platyphylla is a species of grasstree of the genus Xanthorrhoea native to Western Australia.

== Description ==
The perennial grass tree typically grows to a height of 3 metres (10 ft) with the trunk reaching 0 to 0.6 metres (0 to 2 ft), scape of 0.5 to 0.8 metres (1.6 to 2.6 ft) and the flower spike to 0.9 to 1.6 metres (3 to 5 ft). It blooms in June producing cream-white flowers.

== Distribution ==
It has a scattered distribution along the south coast in the Great southern and Goldfields-Esperance regions of Western Australia between Albany and Cape Arid where grows in sandy-clay soils containing gravel.
