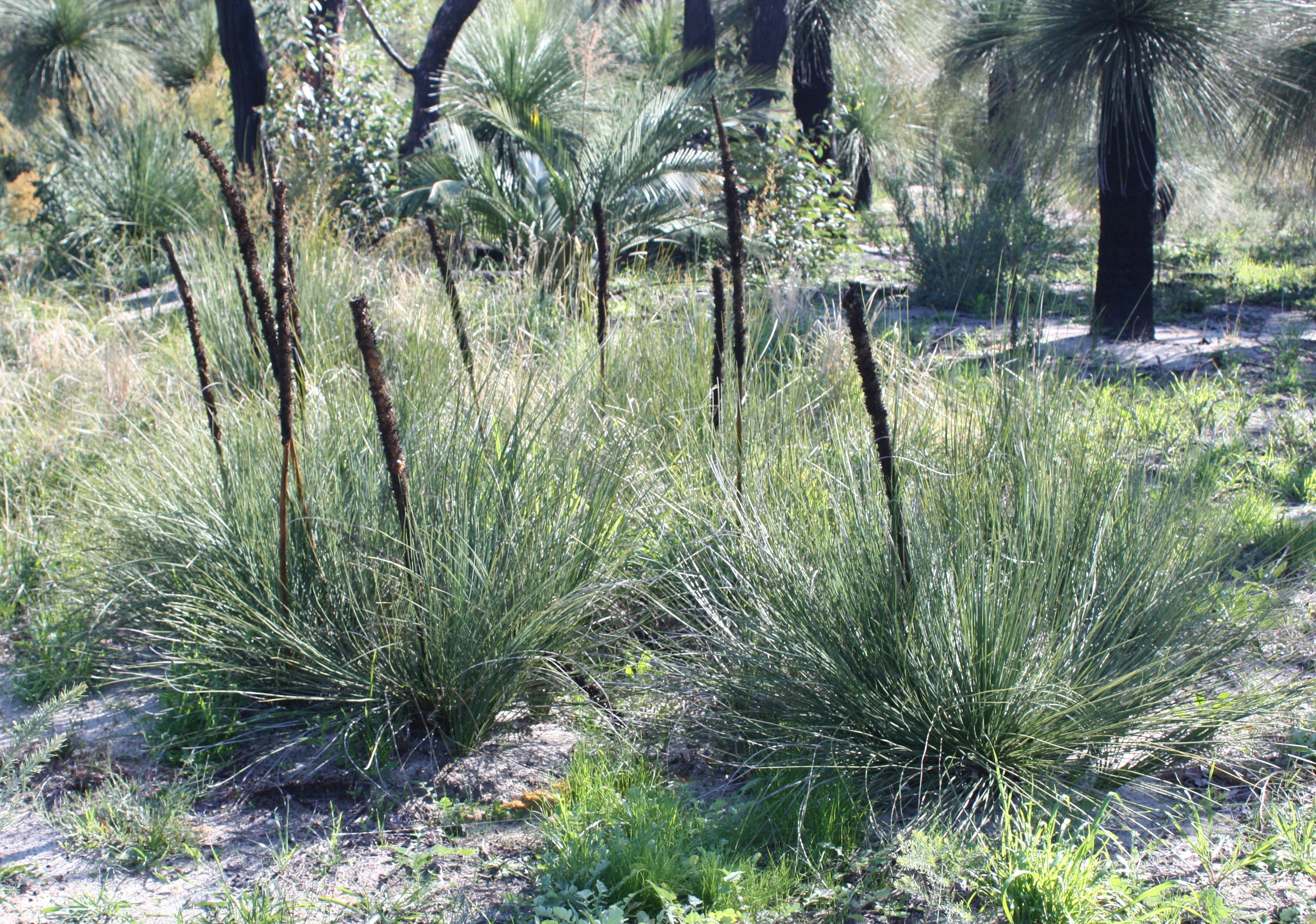
- Xanthorrhoea brunonis at Wireless Hill Park in Perth, Western Australia

Scientific classification
- Kingdom: Plantae
- Clade: Tracheophytes
- Clade: Angiosperms
- Clade: Monocots
- Order: Asparagales
- Family: Asphodelaceae
- Subfamily: Xanthorrhoeoideae
- Genus: Xanthorrhoea
- Species: X. brunonis

Binomial name
- Xanthorrhoea brunonis Endl.

= Xanthorrhoea brunonis =

Species of flowering plant

Xanthorrhoea brunonis is a species of grasstree of the genus Xanthorrhoea native to Western Australia.

== Description ==
The perennial grass tree typically grows to a height of 1.5 metres (5 ft) usually with no trunk but with a scape of 0.35 to 1.5 metres (1.1 to 4.9 ft) and the flower spike to 0.1 to 0.3 metres (0 to 1 ft). It blooms between October and December producing white-cream flowers. It has a tufted appearance with the leaves up to 80 centimetres (31 in) long. The non-flowering part of the stem is always longer than the flowering part. It can be differentiated from Xanthorrhoea preissii by its flower spike.

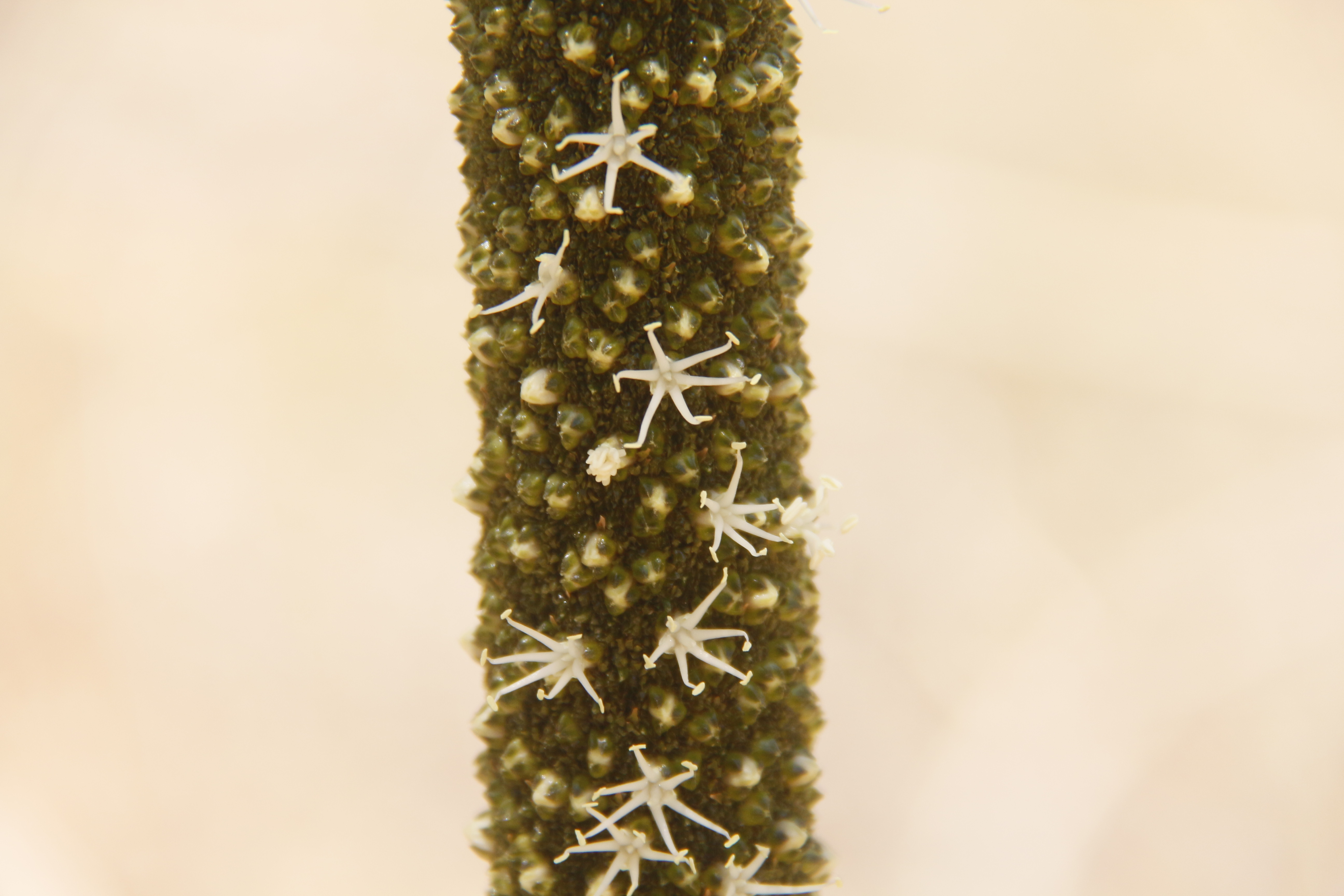
The flower spike of X. brunonis.

== Taxonomy ==
The species was first formally described by the botanist Stephan Endlicher in 1846 as part of Johann Georg Christian Lehmann's work Irideae. Plantae Preissianae.

The genera name Xanthorrhoea is from the Greek words xanthos, meaning "yellow", and rheo, meaning "to flow", referring to the gum which flows from the stem. Brunonis honours Robert Brown, a naturalist on the Flinders expedition.

There are two recognised subspecies:

- Xanthorrhoea brunonis subsp. brunonis
- Xanthorrhoea brunonis subsp. semibarbata

== Distribution ==
It is found on the Swan Coastal Plain and along the west coast in the Wheatbelt, Peel and South West and the south coast of the Great Southern region of Western Australia. It extends from Dandaragan in the north to Augusta in the south where it grows in sandy-clay soils over laterite.
