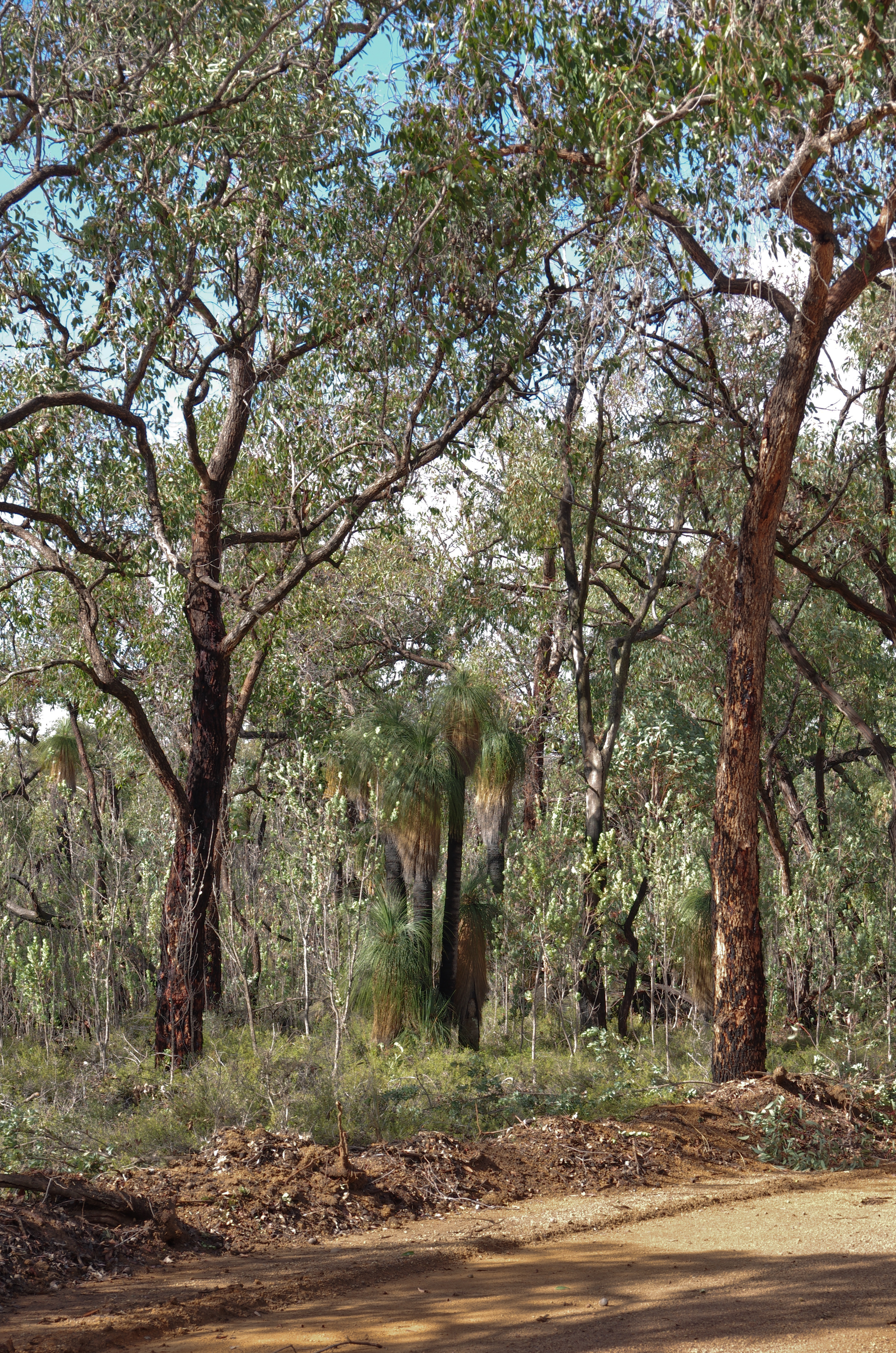
- Xanthorrhoea drummondii in Avon Valley National Park

Conservation status
- Least Concern (IUCN 3.1)

Scientific classification
- Kingdom: Plantae
- Clade: Tracheophytes
- Clade: Angiosperms
- Clade: Monocots
- Order: Asparagales
- Family: Asphodelaceae
- Subfamily: Xanthorrhoeoideae
- Genus: Xanthorrhoea
- Species: X. drummondii

Binomial name
- Xanthorrhoea drummondii Harv.

= Xanthorrhoea drummondii =

Species of flowering plant

Xanthorrhoea drummondii, commonly known as grasstree or Drummond's balga, is a species of grasstree of the family Asphodelaceae. It is native to Western Australia.

== Description ==
The perennial grass tree can grow to a height of 4.5 metres (15 ft) with the trunk reaching 2 metres (7 ft), scape of 0.5 metres (1.6 ft) and the flower spike to 1.8 metres (6 ft). It blooms between September and November producing yellow-white flowers.

The stem is usually simple with a single crown. Young leaves form a stiffly erect tuft with older leaves often strongly reflexed forming a skirt around the stem. The glaucous grey-green leaves are quadrate-rhombic in cross-section and about 1.8 to 2.5 millimetres (0.07 to 0.10 in) wide and 1.3 to 2.3 millimetres (0.05 to 0.09 in) thick.

== Taxonomy ==
The species was first formally described by the botanist William Henry Harvey in 1855 as part of Hooker's Journal of Botany and Kew Garden Miscellany.

== Distribution ==
The species is found in the Perth hills and in coastal areas of the Mid West, Wheatbelt and Great Southern regions of Western Australia where it grows in sandy soils over laterite.

== Cultivation ==
X. drummondii is cultivated in gardens and is easily grown from seed. It prefers a light well-drained soil in full sun. It is both drought tolerant and frost resistant.
