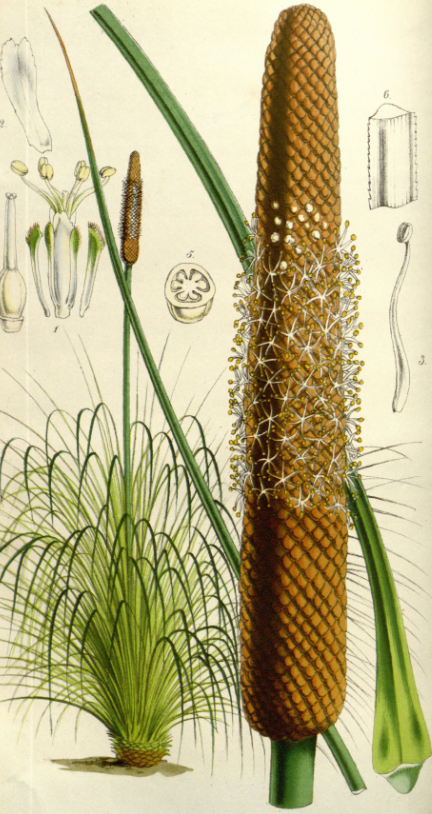
- van Houtte, L., Flore des serres et des jardin de l’Europe
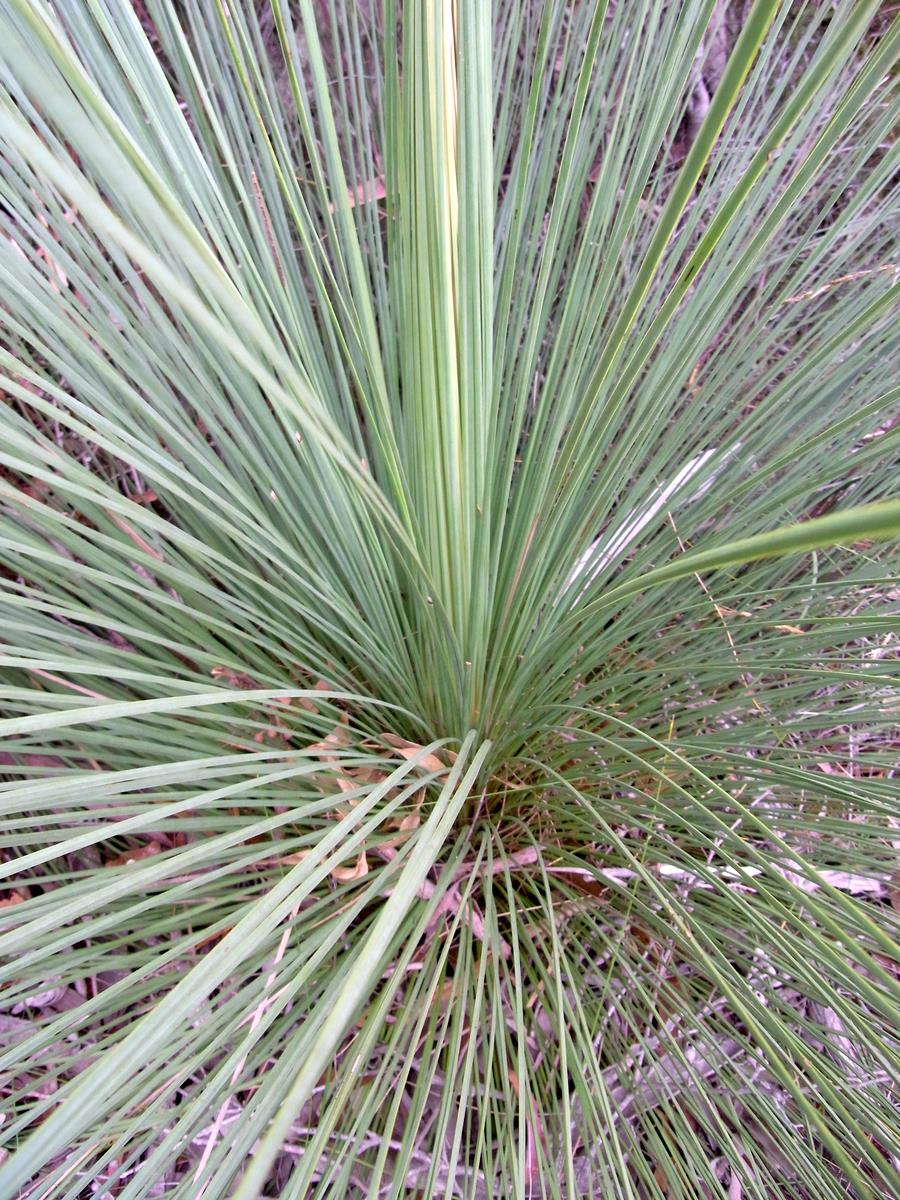
- Ku-ring-gai Chase National Park, Australia

Scientific classification
- Kingdom: Plantae
- Clade: Tracheophytes
- Clade: Angiosperms
- Clade: Monocots
- Order: Asparagales
- Family: Asphodelaceae
- Subfamily: Xanthorrhoeoideae
- Genus: Xanthorrhoea
- Species: X. resinosa

Binomial name
- Xanthorrhoea resinosa Pers.

Synonyms
- Xanthorrhoea hastilis Pers.; Xanthorrhoea resinifera (Sol. ex Kite) E.C.Nelson & D.J.Bedford, nom. inval.

= Xanthorrhoea resinosa =

Species of flowering plant

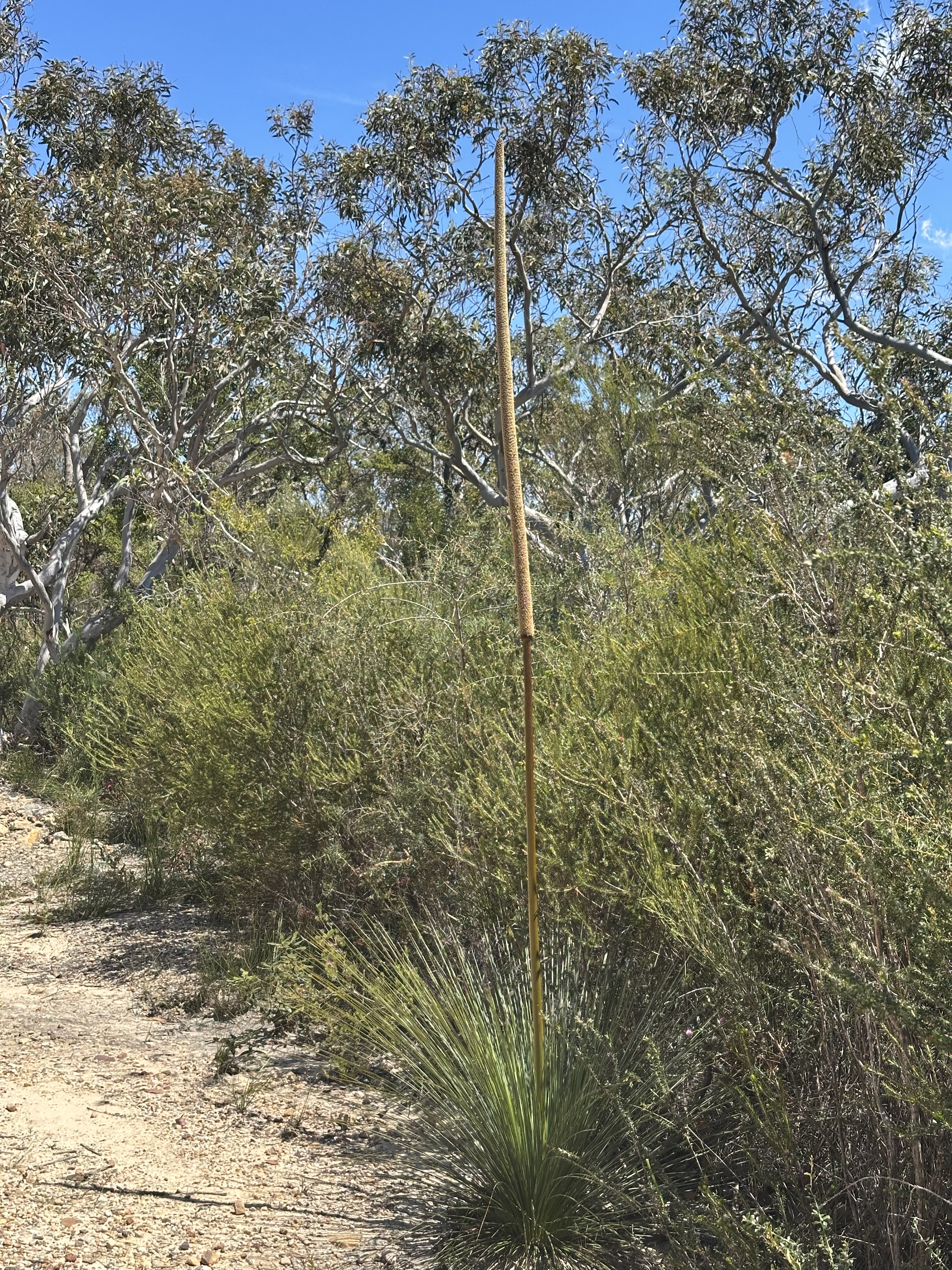
Xanthorrhoea resinosa in Ku-ring-gai Chase National Park

Xanthorrhoea resinosa (synonyms X. hastilis, X. resinifera), is known as one of the grass trees, a mid-sized plant in the genus Xanthorrhoea. The specific epithet is from the Latin, meaning “having resin”. This perennial shrub is found in heathland or eucalyptus forest.

This plant usually has no trunk, or a small trunk about 60 cm (24 in) high, under the skirt of leaves. It may grow to 2.5 metres (8 ft) tall. Similar in appearance to Xanthorrhoea media. The leaves are only 3 to 4 mm wide and glaucous. Flowering occurs between August and October. The flowering spike is shorter than the scape, and is particularly furry, due to the felty bracts.
