= Xanthorrhoea bracteata =

Shiny grasstree

Conservation status
- Endangered (EPBC Act)

Scientific classification
- Kingdom: Plantae
- Clade: Tracheophytes
- Clade: Angiosperms
- Clade: Monocots
- Order: Asparagales
- Family: Asphodelaceae
- Subfamily: Xanthorrhoeoideae
- Genus: Xanthorrhoea
- Species: X. bracteata

Binomial name
- Xanthorrhoea bracteata R.Br.

Synonyms
- Xanthorrhoea minor R.Br.

Species of grasstree

Xanthorrhoea bracteata, the shiny grasstree, is a species of grasstree of the genus Xanthorrhoea endemic to Tasmania, Australia. It is one of many species described by Scottish botanist Robert Brown.

== Description ==
The shiny grasstree grows no discernible trunk, though it may have multiple crowns. The leaves are 40–110 cm long and 1.5–3 mm wide. The flower spike is usually less than a third the length of the scape, which is very thin (4–9 mm diameter). The small white flowers are about 3 mm wide and grow in tight clusters, appearing between January and February. The fruit is a capsule containing round, slightly flattened seeds.

== Distribution and habitat ==
The grasstree is endemic to Tasmania and is known only from a small number of sites between Narawntapu National Park in the Asbestos Range and Mount William in the north-eastern corner of the State. It grows on sandy, coastal heath soils, which are often acidic and waterlogged.

== Conservation ==
The species is considered to be Endangered under the Australian Environment Protection and Biodiversity Conservation Act 1999, and vulnerable under the Tasmanian Threatened Species Protection Act 1995. Threats include infection by Phytophthora cinnamomi, land clearance, inappropriate burning regimes and foliage harvesting.
