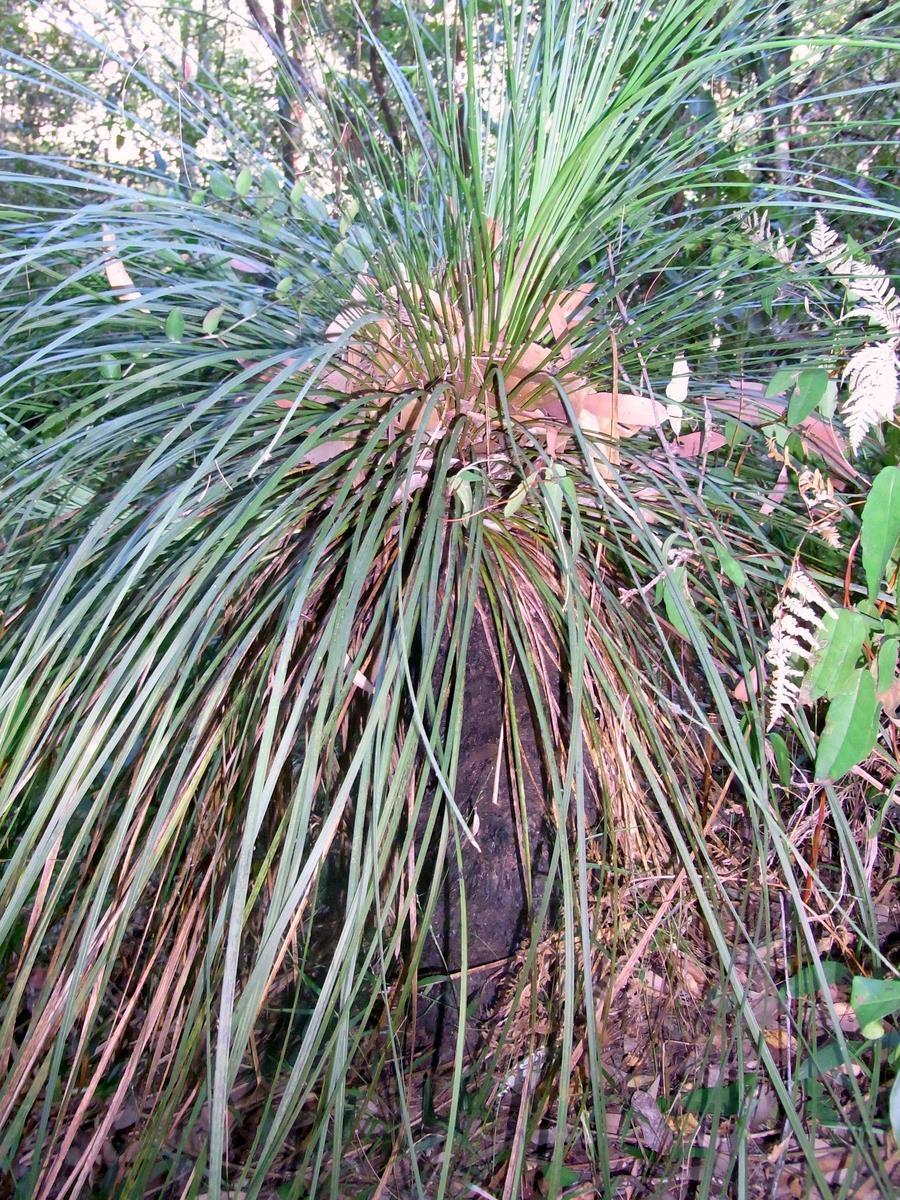
- Chatswood West, Australia

Scientific classification
- Kingdom: Plantae
- Clade: Tracheophytes
- Clade: Angiosperms
- Clade: Monocots
- Order: Asparagales
- Family: Asphodelaceae
- Subfamily: Xanthorrhoeoideae
- Genus: Xanthorrhoea
- Species: X. arborea

Binomial name
- Xanthorrhoea arborea R.Br.

= Xanthorrhoea arborea =

Species of grasstree

Xanthorrhoea arborea a species of grasstree of the genus Xanthorrhoea native to New South Wales and Queensland. It was one of the many species authored by the Scottish botanist Robert Brown.

It grows a trunk up to 2 metres (7 ft) tall. The leaves are dull green to blue-grey, 5 to 8 mm wide. It flowers from January to April, depending on fire.

Xanthorrhoea arborea grows in dry sclerophyll forests around the Sydney Basin on the New South Wales Central Coast westwards over the Great Divide to Rylstone.
