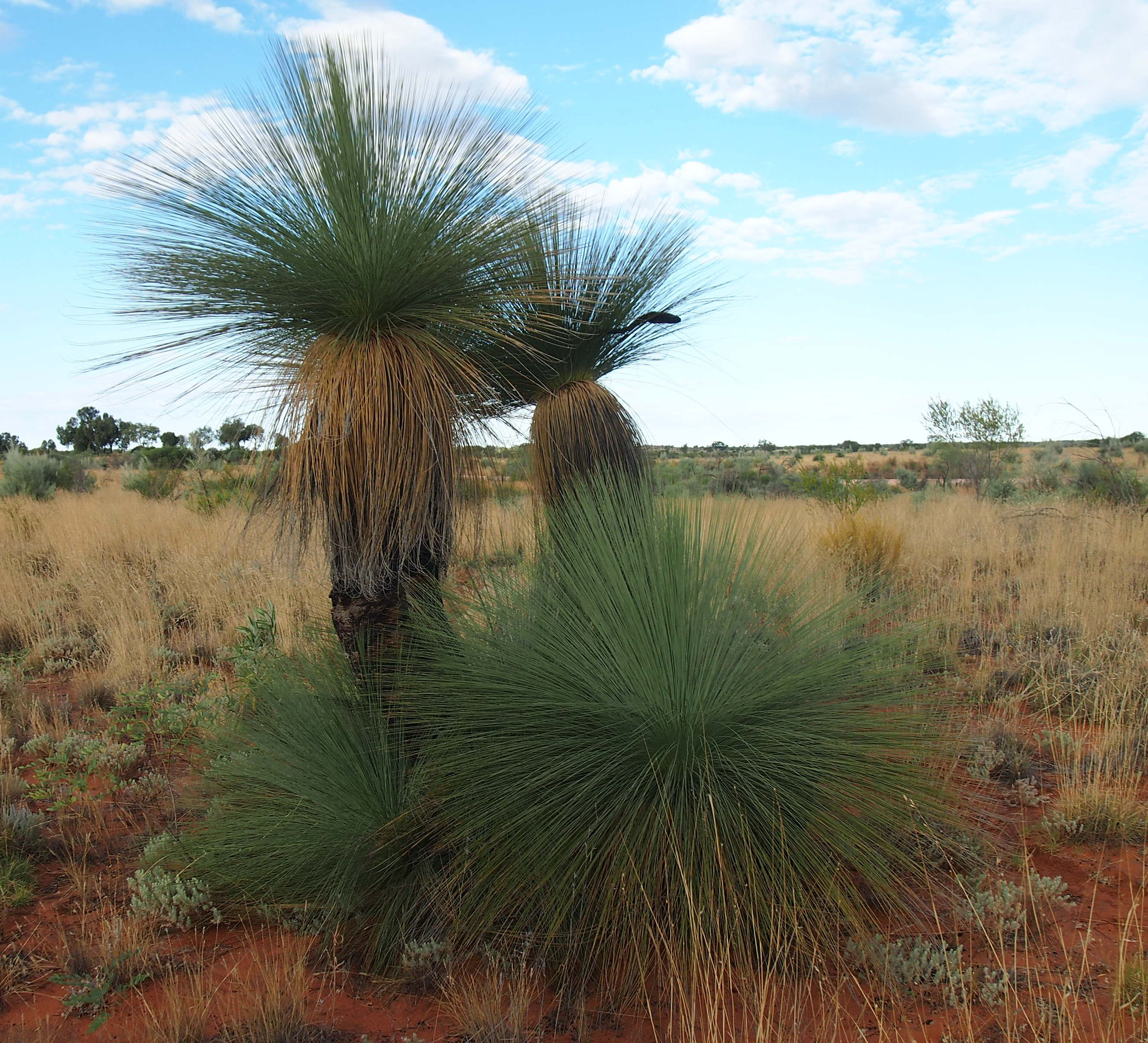
- Grasstrees on a roadside

Conservation status
- Least Concern (IUCN 3.1)

Scientific classification
- Kingdom: Plantae
- Clade: Tracheophytes
- Clade: Angiosperms
- Clade: Monocots
- Order: Asparagales
- Family: Asphodelaceae
- Subfamily: Xanthorrhoeoideae
- Genus: Xanthorrhoea
- Species: X. thorntonii

Binomial name
- Xanthorrhoea thorntonii Tate

= Xanthorrhoea thorntonii =

Species of plant

Xanthorrhoea thorntonii, commonly known as Cundeelee grasstree, Cundeelee blackboy, desert grasstree, yacka or grasstree, is a species of grasstree of the genus Xanthorrhoea native to central Australia. It is known to the Pitjantjatjara people as kata-kultu, kata-puru, ulpa or urara, the Warlpiri people as yurlurnkuru and the Arrernte as lunkere. X. thorntonii is the only grass tree found in Central Australia including the Great Sandy Desert, Great Victoria Desert and MacDonnell Ranges.

== Description ==
The perennial grass tree typically grows to a height of 5 metres (16 ft) with the trunk reaching 5 metres (16 ft), scape of 0.6 to 0.8 m (2.0 to 2.6 ft) and the flower spike to 1 to 1.5 m (3 to 5 ft). It blooms between August and December producing cream-white flowers. It has numerous long linear entire leaves radiating from the apex of one or more stout trunks. The white flowers are densely packed into long-stalked robust spikes. The plant is slow growing, long lived and fire-resistant with a crown of strongly reflexed leaves that are quadrate-rhomboid in cross section. It produces an acaroid resin that was used by Indigenous Australians to fix spear heads to shafts.

== Taxonomy ==
The species was first formally described by the botanist Ralph Tate in 1896 in the W.B. Spencer work Botany. Report on the work of the Horn Scientific Expedition to Central Australia from samples collected during the Horn Expedition in 1894. The only synonym of the species is Xanthorrhoea thorntoni which was also described by Tate.

== Distribution ==
It has a scattered distribution in the arid central parts of Western Australia in the Pilbara, Mid West and Goldfields-Esperance regions where it grows in sandy soils. It is also commonly found in the north west of South Australia and the south of the Northern Territory to the south west of Alice Springs. Found on and between sand dunes and on sandy plains as part of Triodia dominated ecosystems.
