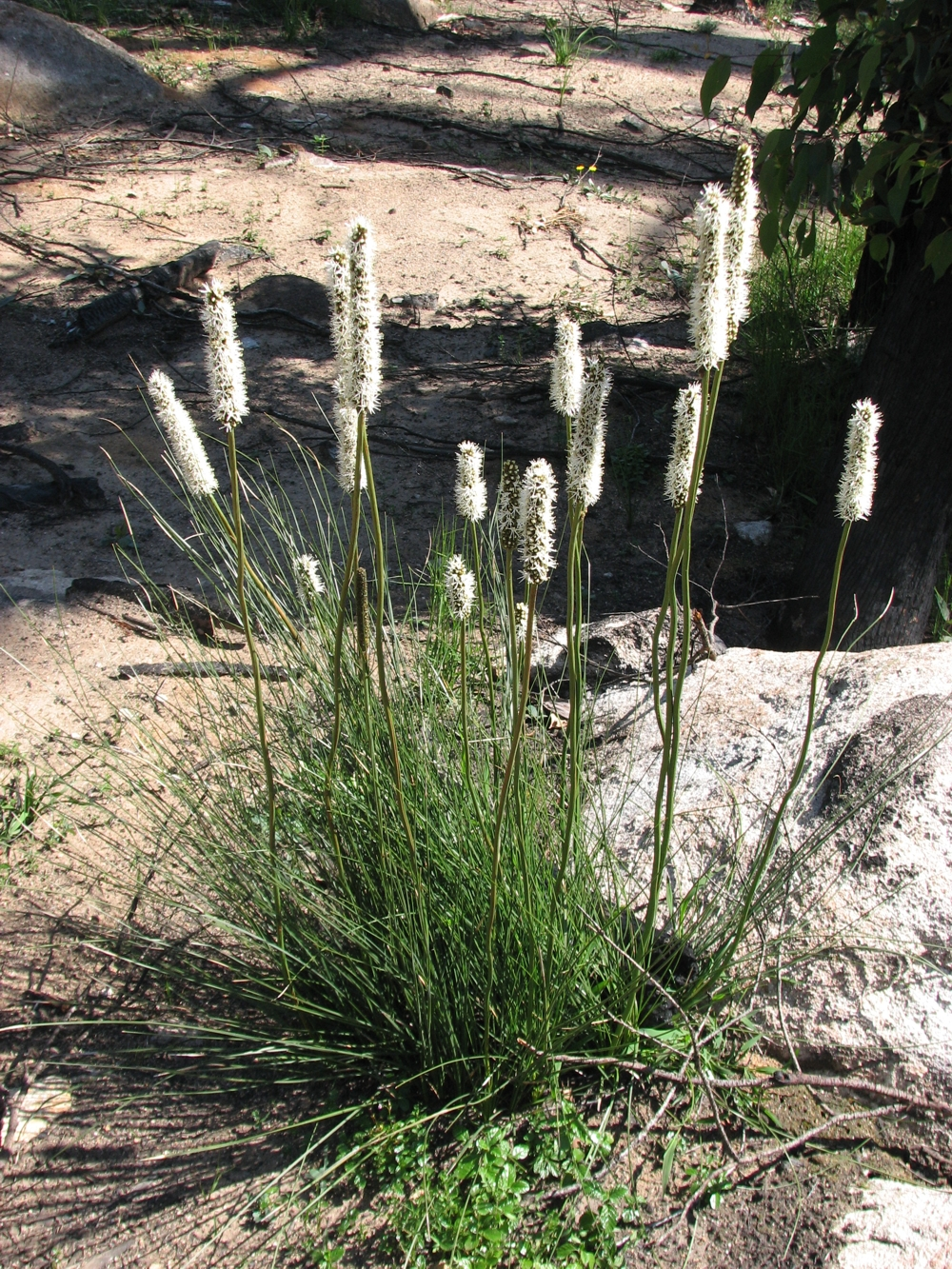
- Xanthorrhoea minor subsp.lutea at Bunyip State Park in Victoria

Scientific classification
- Kingdom: Plantae
- Clade: Tracheophytes
- Clade: Angiosperms
- Clade: Monocots
- Order: Asparagales
- Family: Asphodelaceae
- Subfamily: Xanthorrhoeoideae
- Genus: Xanthorrhoea
- Species: X. minor

Binomial name
- Xanthorrhoea minor R.Br.

= Xanthorrhoea minor =

Species of plant

Xanthorrhoea minor is a species of trunkless grasstree in the family Asphodelaceae native to south-eastern Australia. It was one of the many species authored by the Scottish botanist Robert Brown.

Unlike some other species of grasstree, it lacks a trunk, and its leaves grow from one or more underground stems. The leaves are green. It flowers from October to November.

Two subspecies are currently recognised:

- X. minor subsp. lutea from South Australia and Victoria
- X. minor subsp. minor from New South Wales, which grows in wet poorly drained areas such as swamps around the Sydney Basin, north to Gosford, and west to Springwood and south to Campbelltown.
