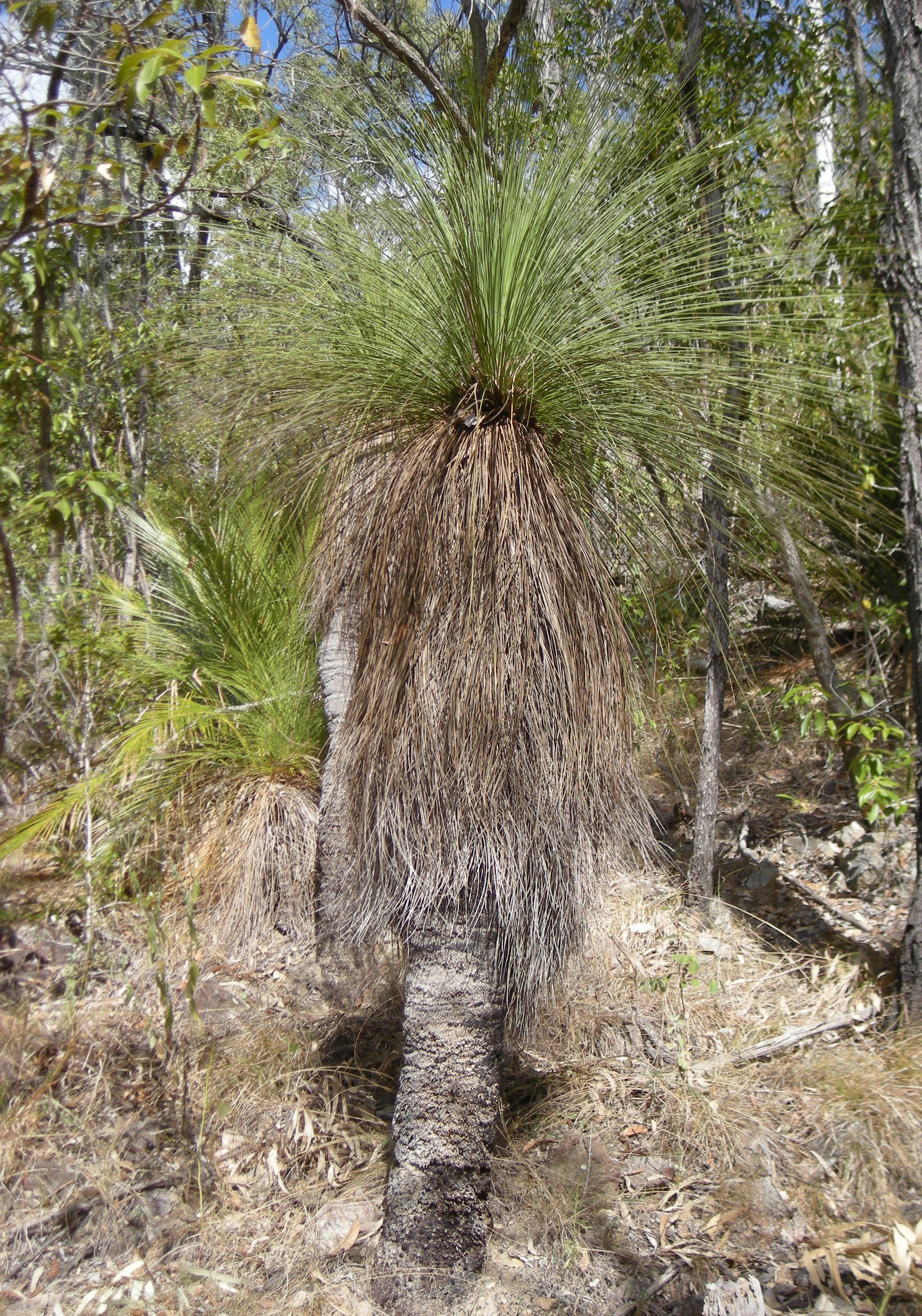

Scientific classification
- Kingdom: Plantae
- Clade: Embryophytes
- Clade: Tracheophytes
- Clade: Spermatophytes
- Clade: Angiosperms
- Clade: Monocots
- Order: Asparagales
- Family: Asphodelaceae
- Subfamily: Xanthorrhoeoideae
- Genus: Xanthorrhoea
- Species: X. latifolia

Binomial name
- Xanthorrhoea latifolia (A.T.Lee) D.J.Bedford

= Xanthorrhoea latifolia =

Eastern coastal grass tree

Species of flowering plant

Xanthorrhoea latifolia is a species of grasstree of the genus Xanthorrhoea native to New South Wales and Queensland.

Usually found growing in sandy or gravelly soil in the coastal regions of eastern Australia north from Wyong, New South Wales up to Cairns Queensland. The trunk of this grass tree is either absent or can grow over 3.5 metres high.
