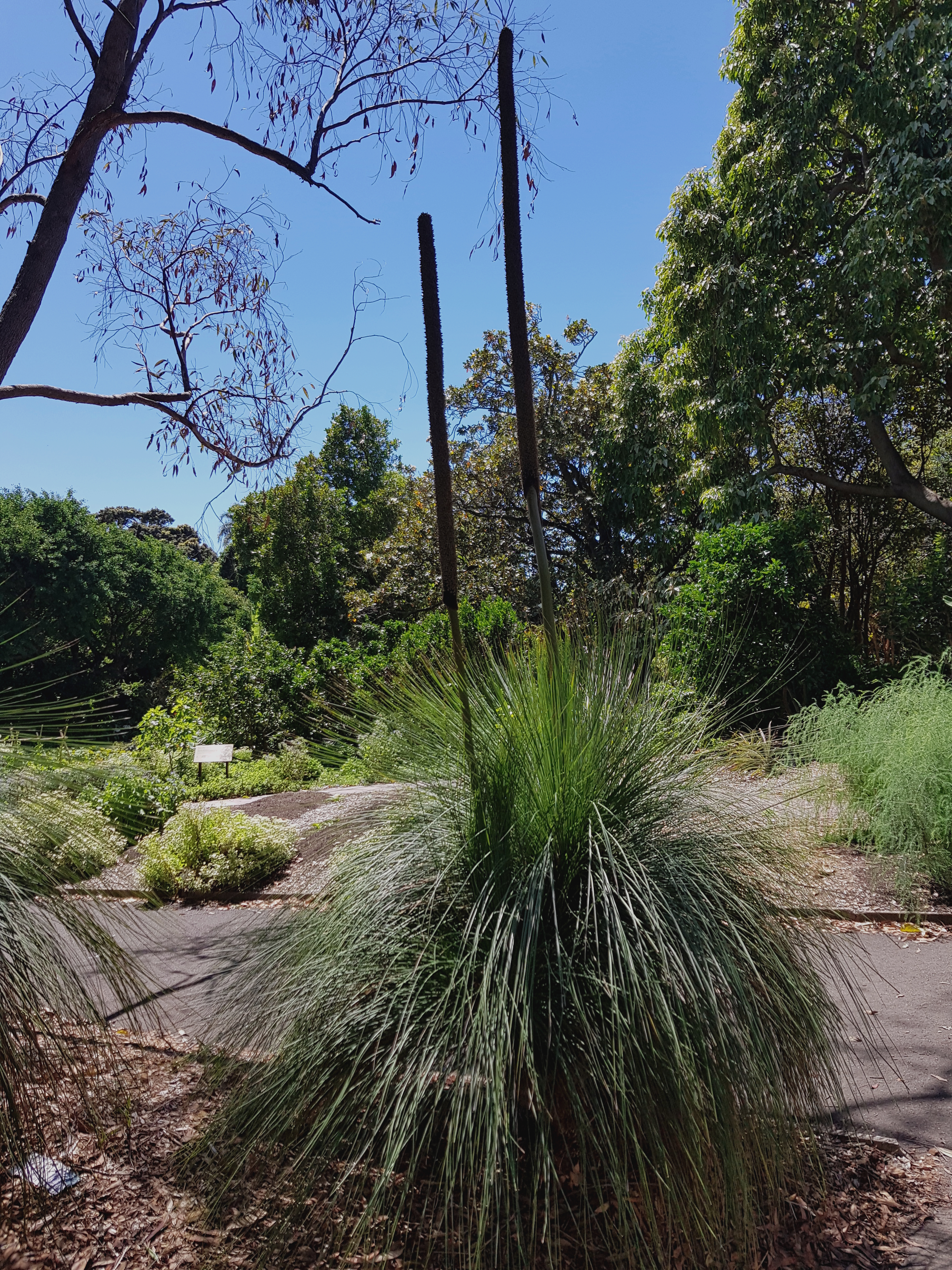
- Growing in Ku-ring-gai Chase National Park, Australia

Scientific classification
- Kingdom: Plantae
- Clade: Embryophytes
- Clade: Tracheophytes
- Clade: Spermatophytes
- Clade: Angiosperms
- Clade: Monocots
- Order: Asparagales
- Family: Asphodelaceae
- Subfamily: Xanthorrhoeoideae
- Genus: Xanthorrhoea
- Species: X. media

Binomial name
- Xanthorrhoea media R.Br.

= Xanthorrhoea media =

Gulgadya

Species of flowering plant

Xanthorrhoea media, known as a grass tree, or Gulgadya in the Cadigal language, is a mid-sized plant in the genus Xanthorrhoea. The specific epithet media (meaning "middle") is from the Latin, and refers to the fact that this species is in the middle of the taxonomic range for this group.

This perennial shrub is found in heathland or eucalyptus forest on sandstone. It occurs most often in dry sites such as exposed ridges and the sides of hills. The distribution is from near Sydney to the Blue Mountains.

This plant usually has no trunk, or only a small trunk about 30 cm (12 in) high, under the skirt of leaves. It may grow to 2.5 metres (8 ft) tall. The leaves are a mid to dark green, but not glaucous. Flowering occurs between August and March, dependent on fire.

This species first appeared in the scientific literature in 1810, in the Prodromus Florae Novae Hollandiae, authored by the prolific Scottish botanist, Robert Brown.
