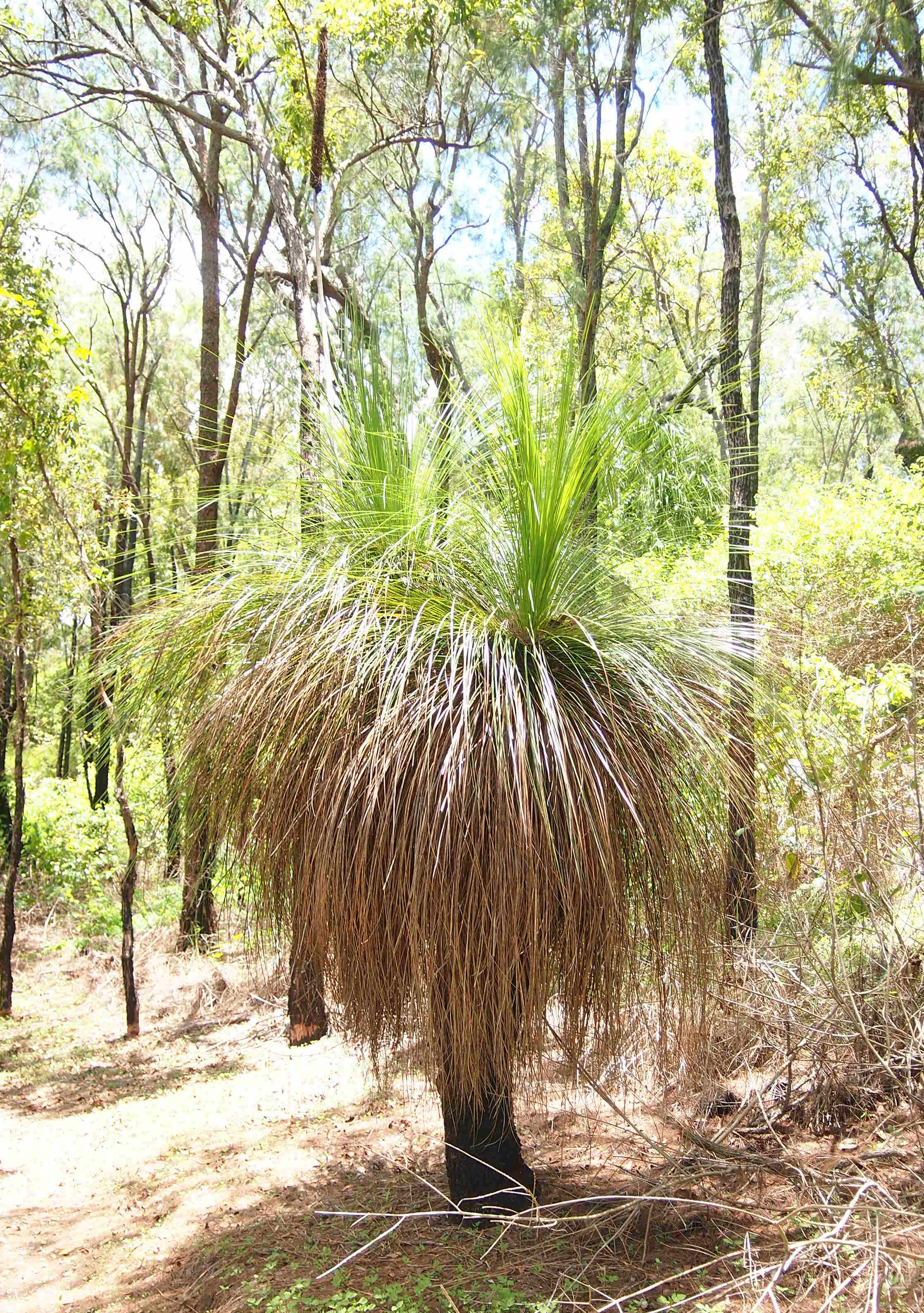

Scientific classification
- Kingdom: Plantae
- Clade: Embryophytes
- Clade: Tracheophytes
- Clade: Spermatophytes
- Clade: Angiosperms
- Clade: Monocots
- Order: Asparagales
- Family: Asphodelaceae
- Subfamily: Xanthorrhoeoideae
- Genus: Xanthorrhoea
- Species: X. johnsonii

Binomial name
- Xanthorrhoea johnsonii A.T.Lee

= Xanthorrhoea johnsonii =

Johnson's grass tree

Species of flowering plant

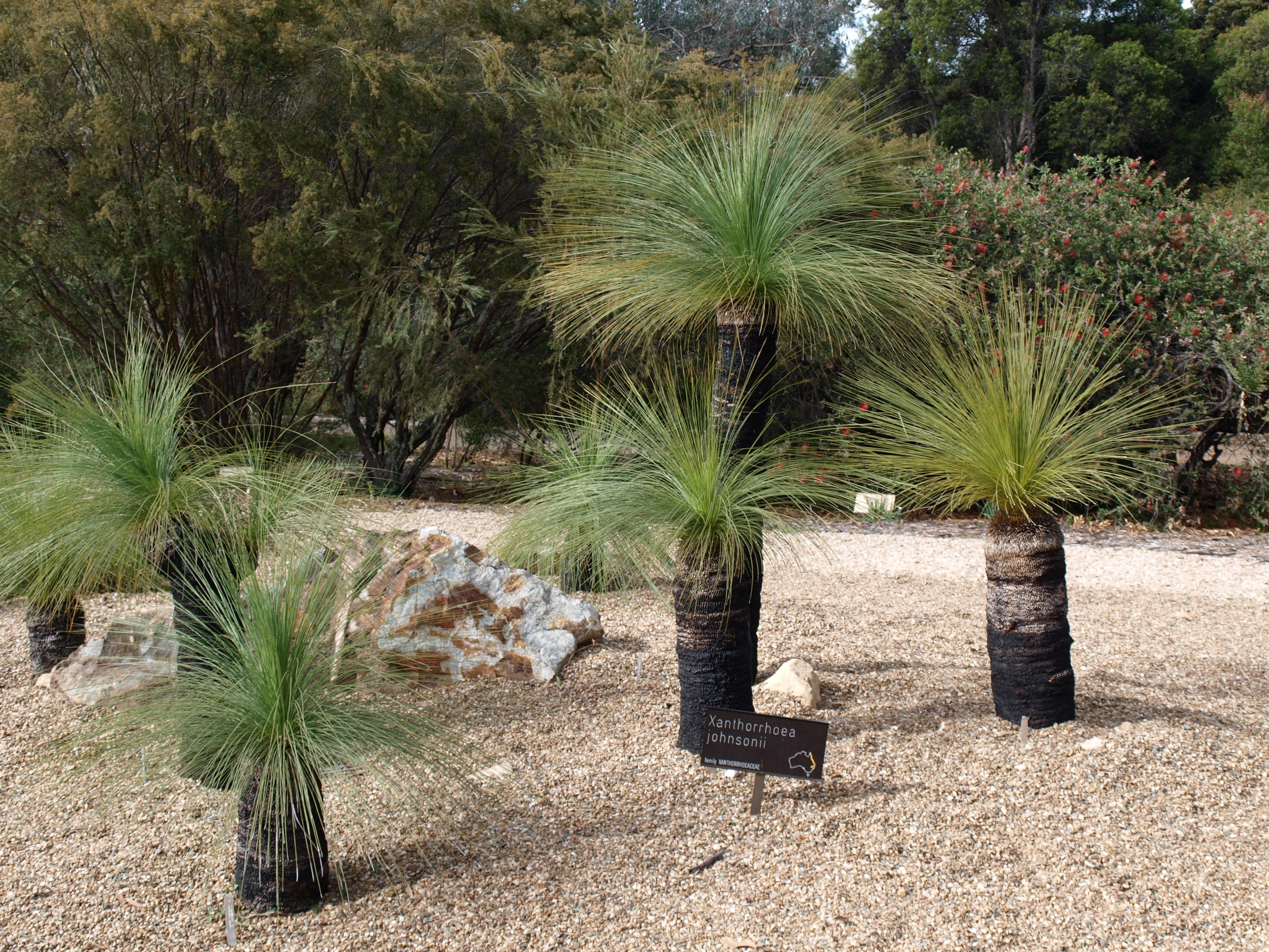
Xanthorrhoea johnsonii in Australian National Botanic Gardens

Xanthorrhoea johnsonii (also known as Johnson's grass tree) is a large plant in the genus Xanthorrhoea found in eastern Australia. The trunk can grow to 5 metres tall. Older foliage is very strong, hence one of the common names being "steel grass", and is commonly used in floral design where it can be bent and looped without breaking.

It was named after the Australian botanist L.A.S. Johnson.
