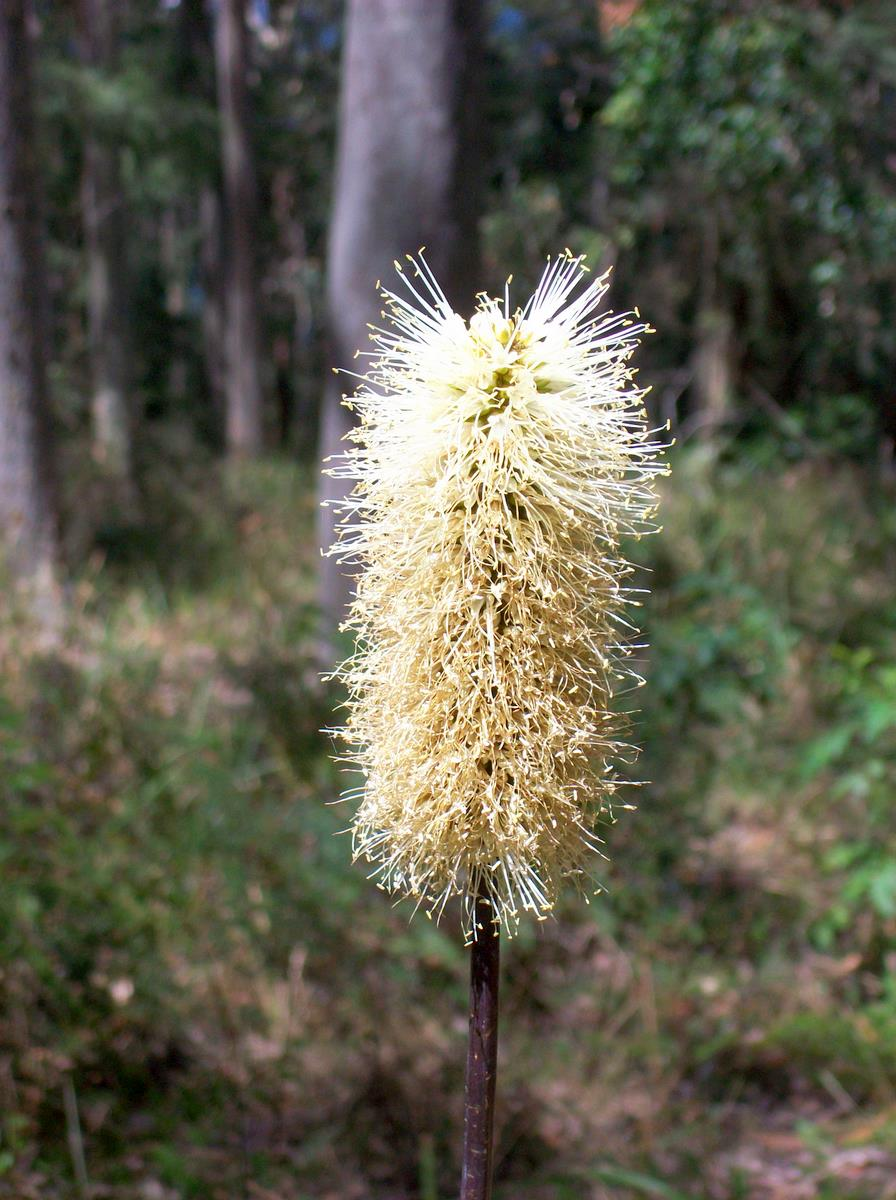
- Ku-ring-gai Chase National Park, Australia

Scientific classification
- Kingdom: Plantae
- Clade: Tracheophytes
- Clade: Angiosperms
- Clade: Monocots
- Order: Asparagales
- Family: Asphodelaceae
- Subfamily: Xanthorrhoeoideae
- Genus: Xanthorrhoea
- Species: X. macronema

Binomial name
- Xanthorrhoea macronema F.Muell. ex Benth.

= Xanthorrhoea macronema =

Bottlebrush grass tree

Species of flowering plant

Xanthorrhoea macronema is a forest plant in the genus Xanthorrhoea, found in coastal regions of eastern Australia north of Sydney, New South Wales to Fraser Island, Queensland. The trunk of this grass tree is underground.

The common name is the bottlebrush grass tree. The plant features yellow flowers resembling those of Banksia or Bottlebrush, around 10 cm long. However, the flowering stem can be up to two metres long. The flowering stem is on average 10 mm in width. Depending on fires, the plant flowers from July to August.

The glossy leaves are 2 to 4 mm wide, triangular in cross section with grooves and ribs. The leaves are rough like sandpaper to touch around the leaf margins.

The specific epithet comes from the Latin for "long thread", referring to the flowering stem.
