= David John Bedford =

Australian botanist

- Born: 1952
- Website: www.davidbedford.info
- Academic career
- Fields: Botany
- Author abbrev. (botany): D.J.Bedford

David John Bedford (born 1952), is an Australian botanist and plant taxonomist who worked as a scientific executive officer and botanist at the National Herbarium of New South Wales. He is notable for his revisions of the genus Xanthorrhoea as well as many new species such as Xanthorrhoea acanthostachya.

The standard author abbreviation D.J.Bedford is used to indicate this person as the author when citing a botanical name.

From an early age he had an interest in Australian flora and fauna, which led to him studying both botany and zoology at the main St Lucia campus of the University of Queensland. After obtaining his BSc Honours (1st Class) he relocated to Sydney and gained his PhD (Doctor of Philosophy) at the School of Biological Sciences, University of Sydney.

In the 1990s, David relocated with his family to Hobart, Tasmania, where he took on the role of Director for the Royal Tasmanian Botanical Gardens, a position he held for six years.
