= Acacia semicircinalis =

Wongan wattle

Conservation status
- Priority Four — Rare Taxa (DEC)

Scientific classification
- Kingdom: Plantae
- Clade: Tracheophytes
- Clade: Angiosperms
- Clade: Eudicots
- Clade: Rosids
- Order: Fabales
- Family: Fabaceae
- Subfamily: Caesalpinioideae
- Clade: Mimosoid clade
- Genus: Acacia
- Species: A. semicircinalis

Binomial name
- Acacia semicircinalis Maiden & Blakely
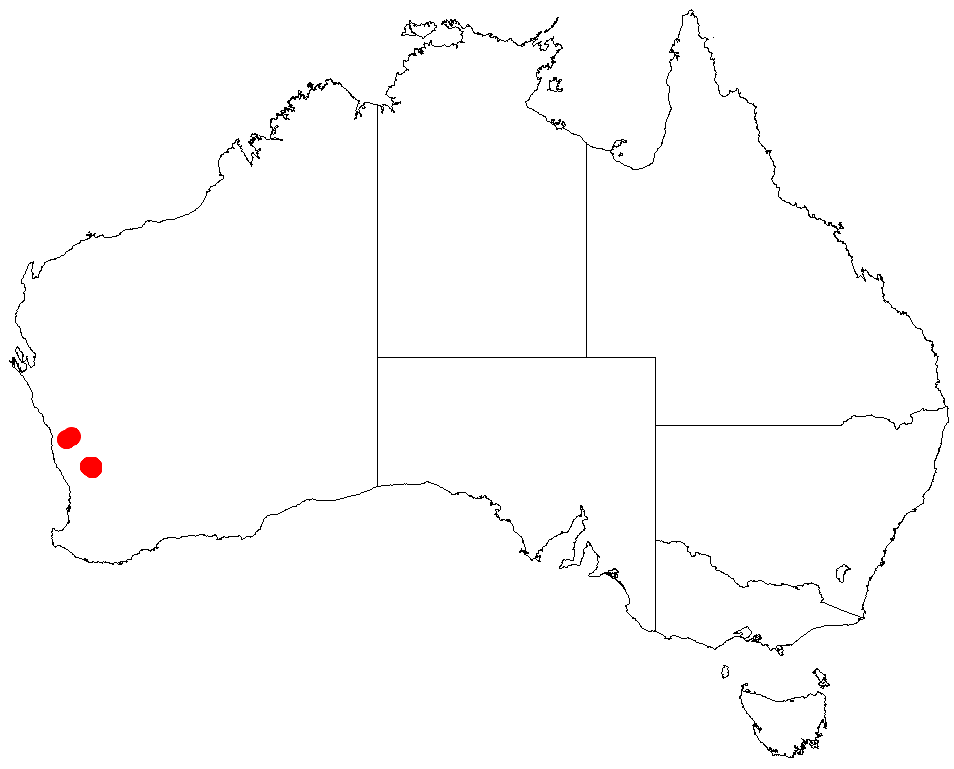
- Occurrence data from AVH

Species of legume

Acacia semicircinalis commonly known as Wongan wattle or Wongan sprawling wattle, is a shrub of the genus Acacia and the subgenus Phyllodineae that is endemic to a small area in western Australia. The species was once listed as a threatened species according to the Environment Protection and Biodiversity Conservation Act 1999 but was removed in 2006.

== Description ==
The wiry diffuse shrub typically grows to a height of 0.3 to 1.0 metre (1 to 3 ft) and can have a ground-hugging or upright habit with sprawling, light to reddish-brown coloured branches. It blooms from August to January and produces yellow flowers. The simple inflorescences occur singly or in pairs in the axils and are made up of spherical flower-heads composed of 25 bright golden yellow flowers. Following flowering it produced linear to slightly curved seed pods that have a length of about 6 cm (2.4 in) and a width of 6 mm (0.24 in).

== Taxonomy ==
The species was first formally described by the botanists Joseph Maiden and William Blakely in 1927 as part of the work Descriptions of fifty new species and six varieties of western and northern Australian Acacias, and notes on four other species as published in the Journal of the Royal Society of Western Australia. It was reclassified as Racosperma semicircinale by Leslie Pedley in 2003 then returned to genus Acacia in 2005.

== Distribution ==
It is native to a small area in the Wheatbelt region of Western Australia where it is commonly situated on hillslopes growing in gravelly lateritic soils. It has a very limited range in the Wongan Hills area where it is thought to be an opportunist in disturbed areas that is long living. It is usually found as a part of Mallee and acacia shrubland communities, and often found with Allocasuarina campestris, Petrophile shuttleworthiana, Eucalyptus longicornis, Acacia acanthoclada, Acacia lasiocarpa and Acacia pulchella. In 2006 there was an estimated 10,400 mature individual plants situated within fifteen separate populations found over an area of approximately 60 km^{2} (23 sq mi).

== See also ==
- List of Acacia species
