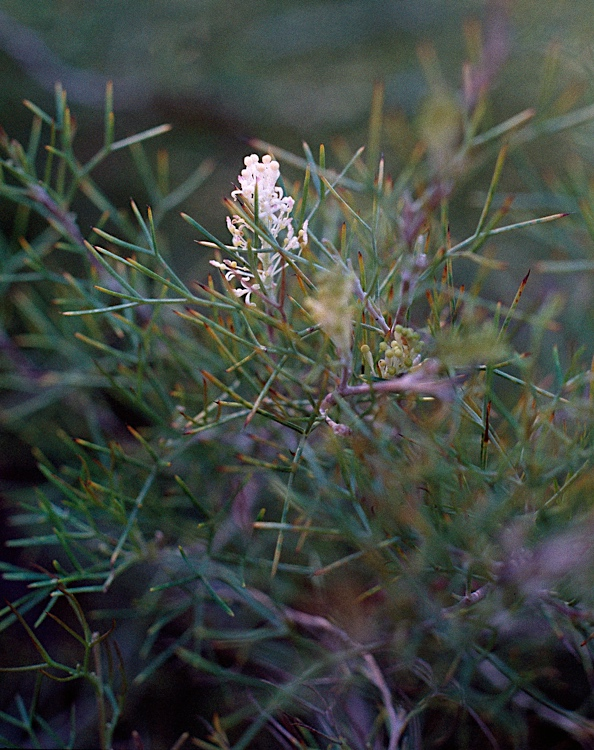
- In Kings Park, Perth

Conservation status
- Declared rare (DEC)

Scientific classification
- Kingdom: Plantae
- Clade: Tracheophytes
- Clade: Angiosperms
- Clade: Eudicots
- Order: Proteales
- Family: Proteaceae
- Genus: Grevillea
- Species: G. rara

Binomial name
- Grevillea rara Olde & Marriott

= Grevillea rara =

Species of shrub endemic to Western Australia

Grevillea rara, also known as the rare grevillea, is a species of flowering plant in the family Proteaceae and is endemic to a restricted part of the South West region of Western Australia. It is a prostrate, sprawling shrub when young, later a dense, prickly shrub with pinnatisect leaves with linear lobes, and clusters of white to pale pink flowers.

== Description ==
Grevillea rara is a prostrate, sprawling shrub when young, later a dense, spreading, prickly shrub up to 2 m (6 ft 7 in) high and 1 m (3 ft 3 in) wide with woolly-hairy branchlets. The leaves are 15–25 mm (0.59–0.98 in) long, up to 15 mm (0.59 in) wide and pinnatisect with 3 to 5 lobes that are sometimes divided again, the end lobes linear 4–20 mm (0.16–0.79 in) long and 0.3–0.8 mm (0.012–0.031 in) wide. The edges of the leaf lobes are rolled under, obscuring the lower surface. The flowers are arranged in more or less spherical to dome-shaped clusters on a woolly-hairy rachis, and are white, sometimes tinged with pink, the pistil 25–27 mm (0.98–1.06 in) long. Flowering occurs from August to November and the fruit is an oblong follicle.

The species is closely related to Grevillea curviloba, with slight differences such as fine hairs on the branchlets and inflorescence stems and narrow leaf lobes.

== Taxonomy ==
Grevillea rara was first formally described in 1993 by Peter Olde and Neil Marriott in the journal Nuytsia from specimens collected north of Collie in 1986. The specific epithet (rara) means "rare", referring to the conservation status of the species.

== Distribution and habitat ==
Rare grevillea is found amongst tall shrubs or medium trees in shrubland and jarrah forest in a small area north of Collie. It grows in lateritic, gravelly, sandy or clay soils. Associated species include Eucalyptus marginata, Corymbia calophylla, Banksia grandis, Hakea lasiantha, Xanthorrhoea preissii, Acacia pulchella, and Acacia drummondii.

== Conservation status ==
Initially. G. rara was known from two populations, one of which was flooded by the construction of the Harris River Dam in 1990. In 1997, six populations of the species, comprising 1,515 individual plants were known. Rare grevillea is listed as "Threatened" by the Western Australian Government Department of Biodiversity, Conservation and Attractions, meaning that it is in danger of extinction. The main threats to the species are road and firebreak maintenance, weed invasion and inappropriate fire regimes.

== See also ==
- List of Grevillea species
