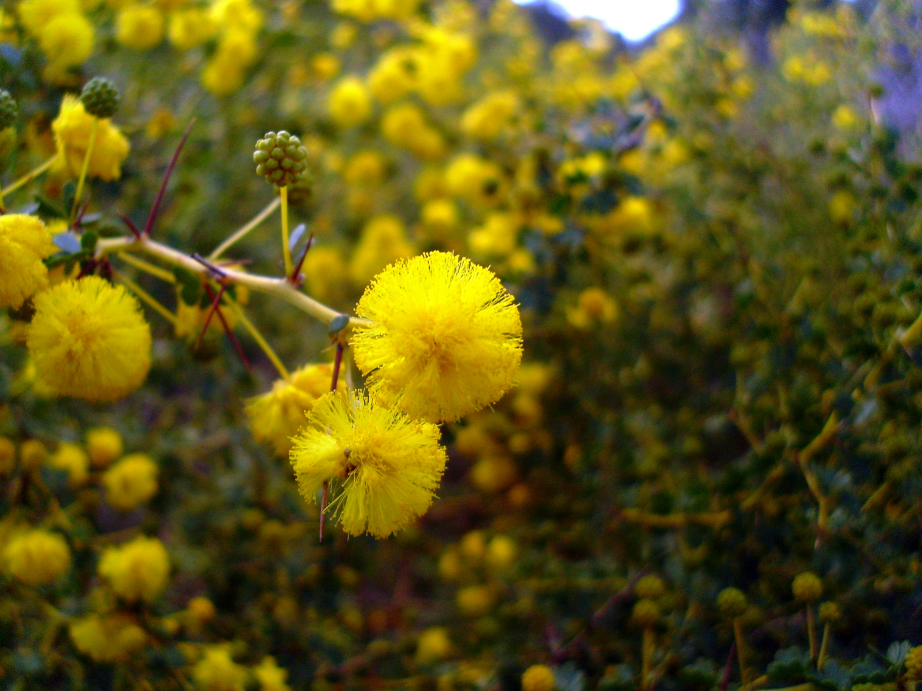

Scientific classification
- Kingdom: Plantae
- Clade: Embryophytes
- Clade: Tracheophytes
- Clade: Spermatophytes
- Clade: Angiosperms
- Clade: Eudicots
- Clade: Rosids
- Order: Fabales
- Family: Fabaceae
- Subfamily: Caesalpinioideae
- Clade: Mimosoid clade
- Genus: Acacia
- Species: A. pulchella

Binomial name
- Acacia pulchella R.Br.
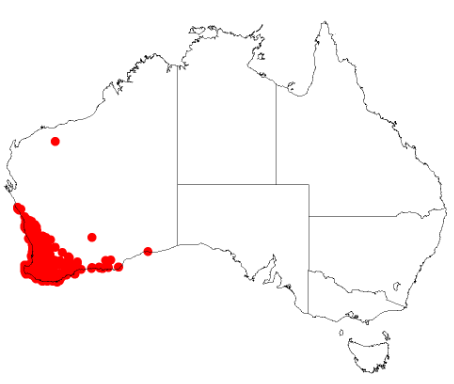
- Occurrence data from AVH

Synonyms
- Acacia pulchella f. typica E.Pritz. Racosperma pulchellum (R.Br.) Pedley

= Acacia pulchella =

Prickly Moses

Species of shrub

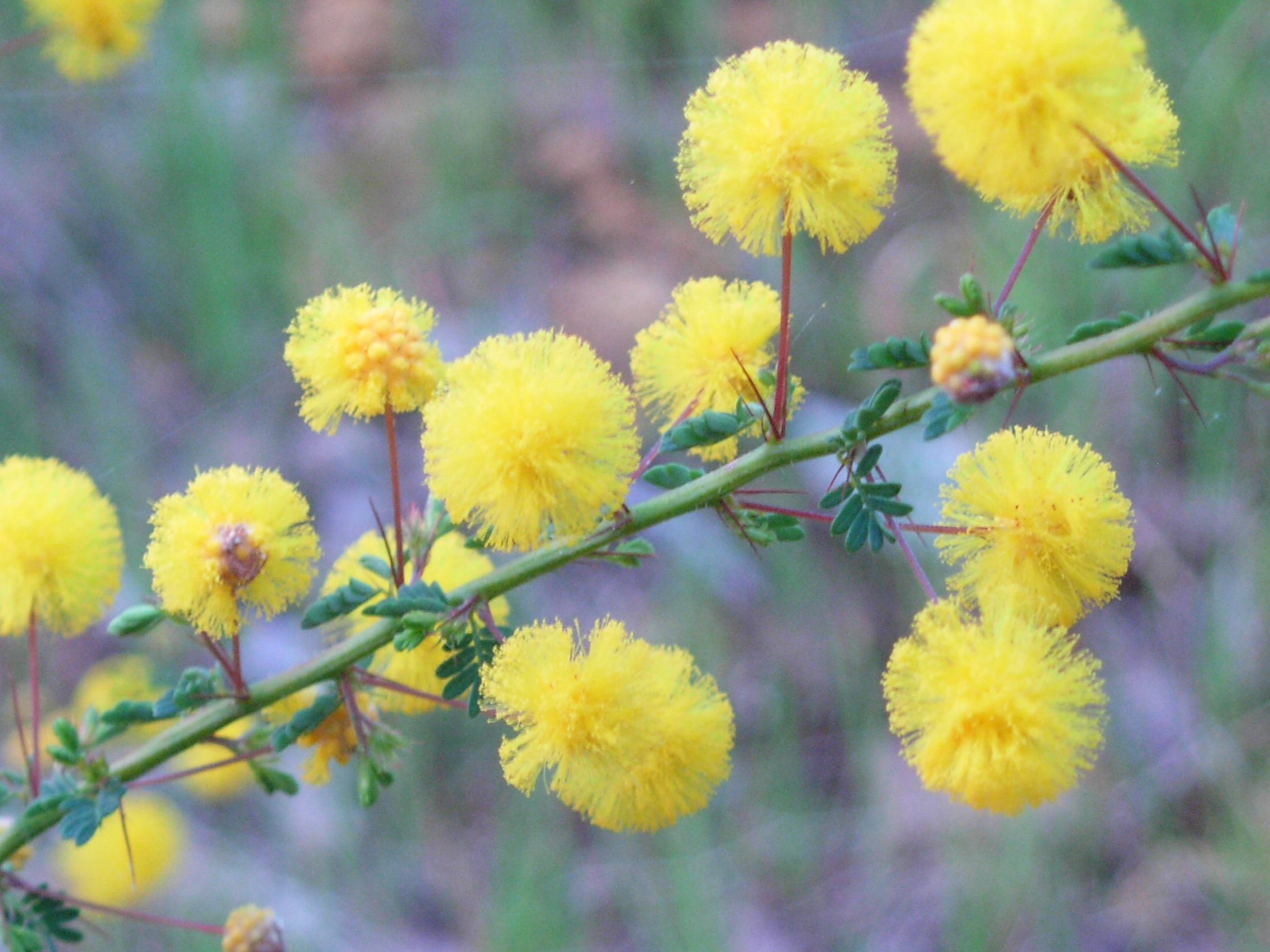
In Glen Forrest

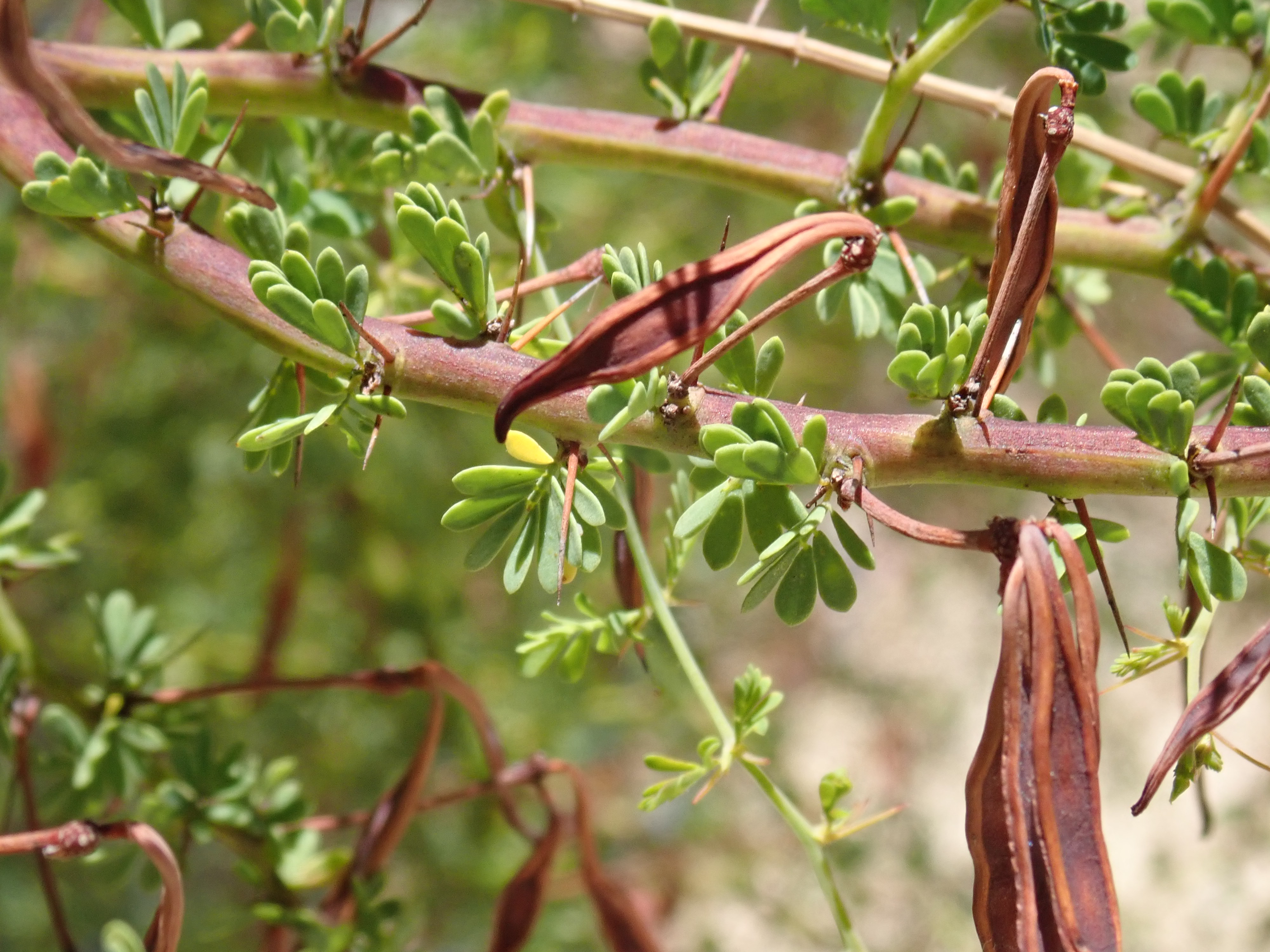
Seed pods

Acacia pulchella, commonly known as prickly moses or western prickly moses, is a shrub in the family Fabaceae. Endemic to Western Australia, it is one of the most common shrubs of the bushland around Perth and in the Darling Range.

== Description ==
The shrub typically grows to a height of 1.5 m (4 ft 11 in) branches freely, and has flexuose and spine-tipped pale green branchlets and 1 mm (0.039 in) stipules. The leaves are composed of three to five pinnae. Prickly moses is one of only few Acacia species to have true leaves rather than phyllodes. It has feathery, bipinnate leaves with leaflets up to 5 mm long. At the base of each leaf is one or two spines. It flowers in late winter and early spring. The rudimentary inflorescences occur in groups of one to three racemose spherical flower heads with a diameter of about 1 cm (0.39 in), usually containing 10 to 40 but sometimes up to 60 golden coloured flowers. The crustaceous seed pods that form after flowering have a narrowly oblong shape and are flat or slightly undulate with a length of 1.5 to 5 cm (0.59 to 1.97 in) and a width of 3 to 5 mm (0.12 to 0.20 in).The brown seeds inside are mostly oblong and 2.5 to 4.5 mm (0.098 to 0.177 in) in length. The name "prickly moses" is said to be a corruption of "prickly mimosa".

== Taxonomy ==
It was first described in 1813 by Robert Brown.

The specific epithet is derived from Latin and names small and beautiful. There are four recognised varieties:

- A. p. var. glaberrima
- A. p. var. goadbyi
- A. p. var. pulchella
- A. p. var. reflexa

It belongs to the A pulchella group of wattles along with Acacia amputata, Acacia epacantha, Acacia fagonioides, Acacia guinetii, Acacia lasiocarpa and Acacia megacephala.

== Distribution ==
It is found in the Perth, Peel, South West, Great Southern, and southern parts of the Wheatbelt and Mid West, where it is commonly situated in swamps, low-lying areas, and near creeks and rivers. The range of the plant extends from around Geraldton in the north down to near Esperance in the east and to coastal areas in the west and south. Geraldton to Esperance. A single population in Creek Conservation ParkPark has also been recorded in South Australia.

== Ecology ==
Recent research suggests that A. pulchella may in some circumstances suppress the plant pathogen Phytophthora cinnamomi.

== Uses ==
This prickly shrub is useful as a screen to inhibit animal and human access to areas.

== See also ==
- List of Acacia species
