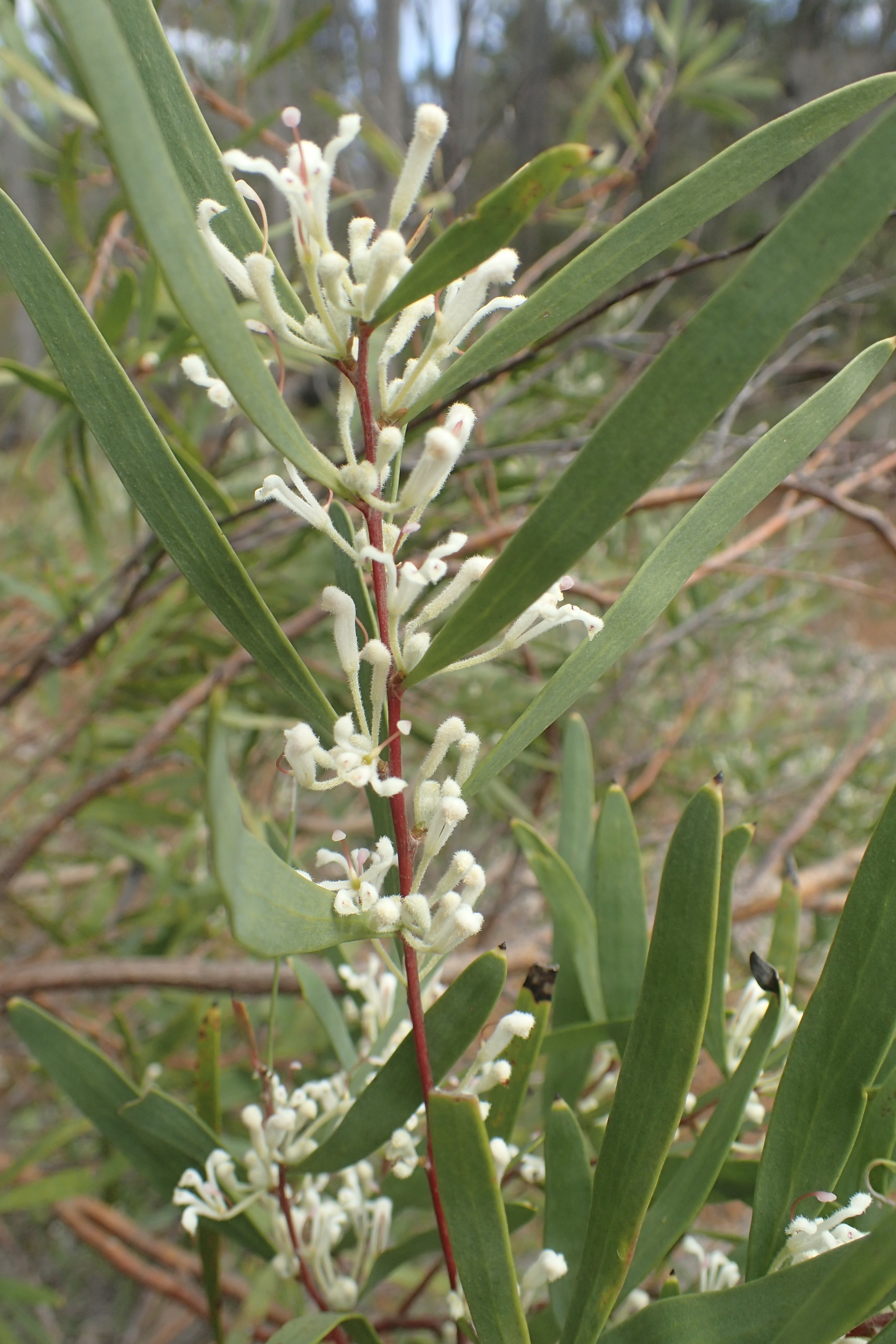

Scientific classification
- Kingdom: Plantae
- Clade: Tracheophytes
- Clade: Angiosperms
- Clade: Eudicots
- Order: Proteales
- Family: Proteaceae
- Genus: Hakea
- Species: H. lasianthoides

Binomial name
- Hakea lasianthoides Rye
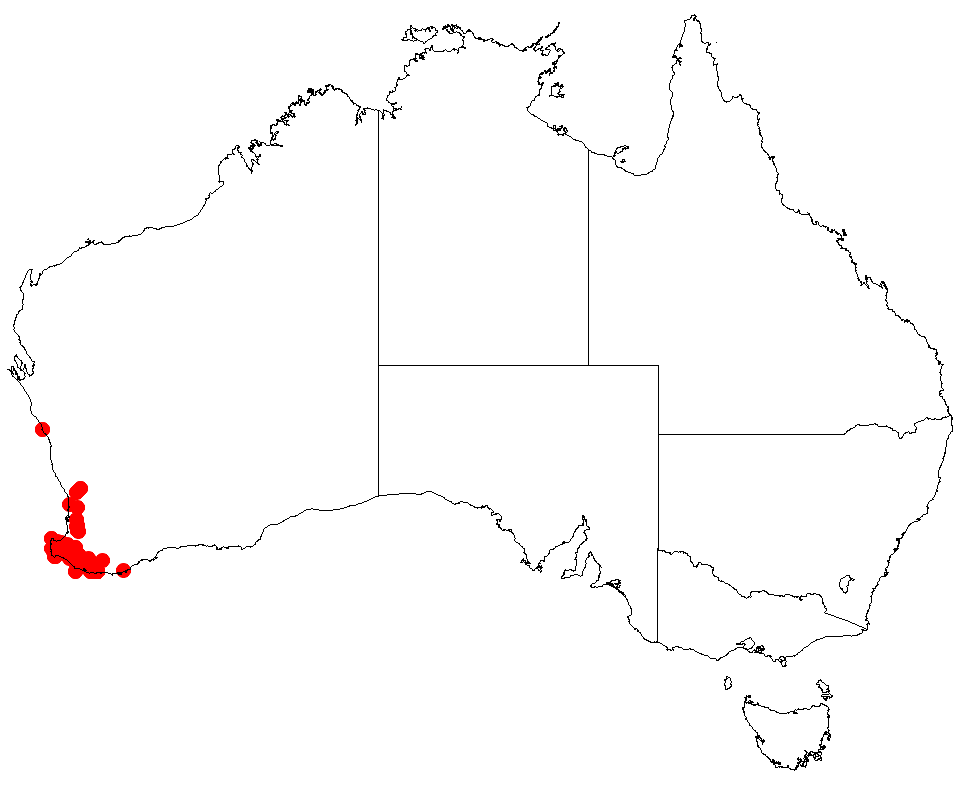
- Occurrence data from AVH

= Hakea lasianthoides =

Species of plant endemic to Western Australia

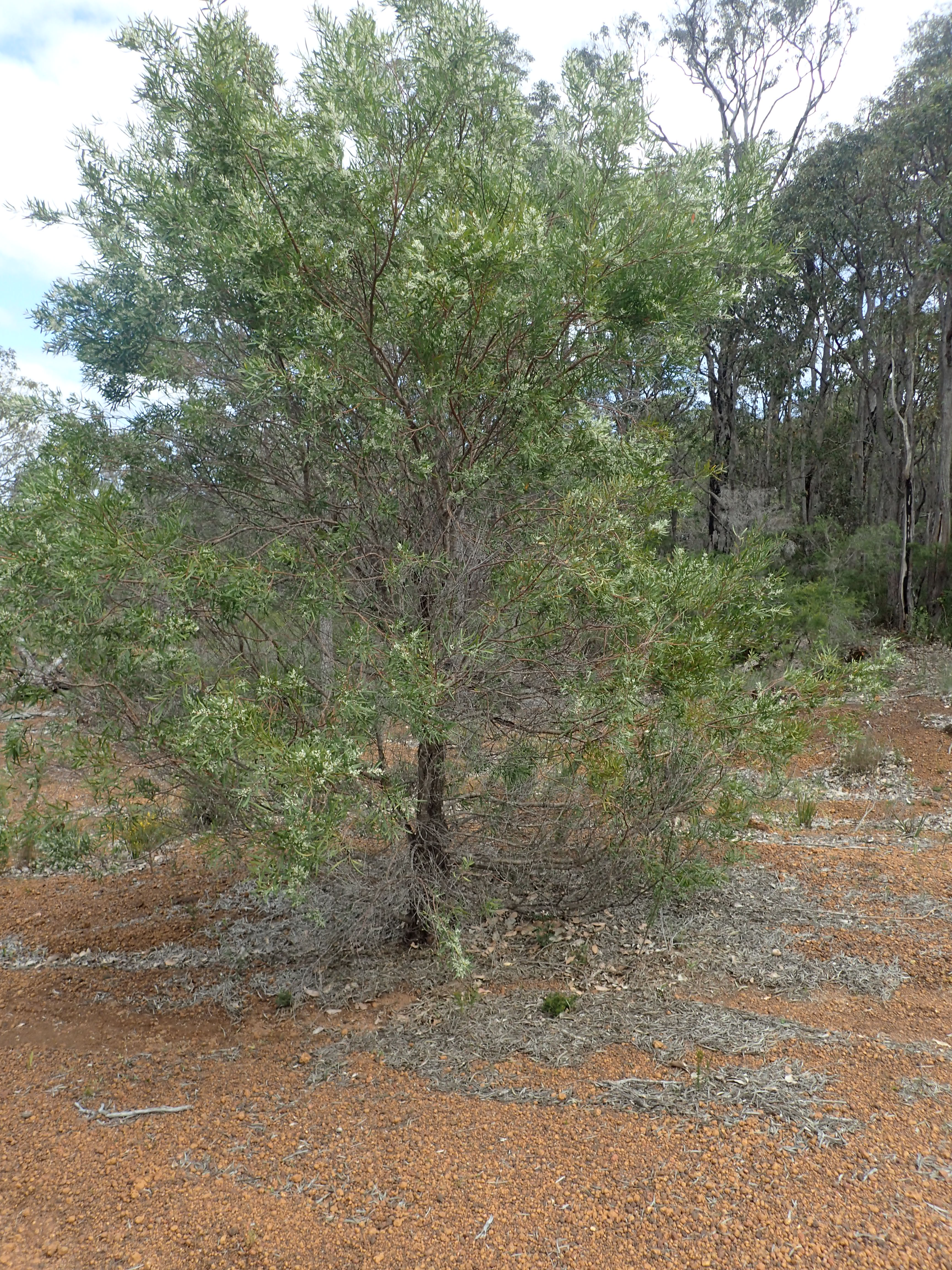
Habit near Margaret River

Hakea lasianthoides is a shrub or tree in the family Proteaceae and is endemic to Western Australia. It has creamy-white flowers, mostly linear leaves and flowers from September to November.

== Description ==
Hakea lasianthoides is an upright shrub or tree that typically grows to a height of 1.5 to 3.5 metres (5 to 11 ft) and does not form a lignotuber. The flat evergreen leaves have a linear to narrowly elliptic or obovate shape and are 3 to 11.5 centimetres (1.2 to 4.5 in) in length and 3 to 11 millimetres (0.118 to 0.433 in) wide. It blooms from September to November and produces white-cream flowers. Each inflorescence is composed of 2 to 8 flowers with cream coloured with hairs extending onto the perianth which is 4.5 to 7 mm (0.177 to 0.276 in) in length. After flowering, smooth leaf-like fruit form with a transversely elliptic shape. Each fruit is 25 to 31 mm (0.98 to 1.22 in) in length and 0.7 to 0.9 mm (0.028 to 0.035 in) wide. The seeds within have an obliquely narrowly elliptic or obovate shape with a wing down one side.

== Taxonomy and naming ==
The species was first formally described by the botanist Barbara Rye in 1984 as part of the work A new species and a new combination among the Proteaceae represented in the Perth Region as published in the journal Nuytsia. The only known synonym is Hakea lasiantha var. angustifolia. The specific epithet is taken from the Greek words lasios meaning hairy or woolly and anthos meaning flower and -oides meaning resembling, referring to the similar appearance of the flowers to Hakea lasiantha.

== Distribution ==
It is endemic to an area in the South West and Great Peel regions of Western Australia from Armadale in the north to Denmark in the south where it is found in damp areas and ridge tops growing in sandy-loam and gravelly soils. It is often found as part of the understorey in jarrah forest communities.
