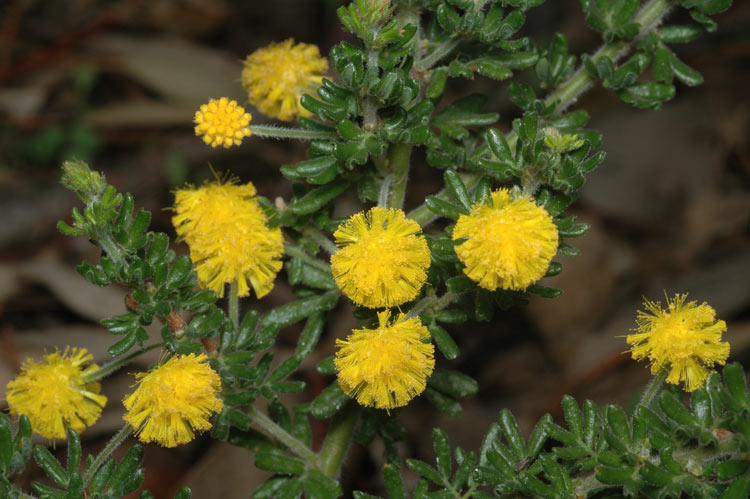
- In the Australian National Botanic Gardens

Conservation status
- Priority Four — Rare Taxa (DEC)

Scientific classification
- Kingdom: Plantae
- Clade: Tracheophytes
- Clade: Angiosperms
- Clade: Eudicots
- Clade: Rosids
- Order: Fabales
- Family: Fabaceae
- Subfamily: Caesalpinioideae
- Clade: Mimosoid clade
- Genus: Acacia
- Species: A. guinetii

Binomial name
- Acacia guinetii Maslin
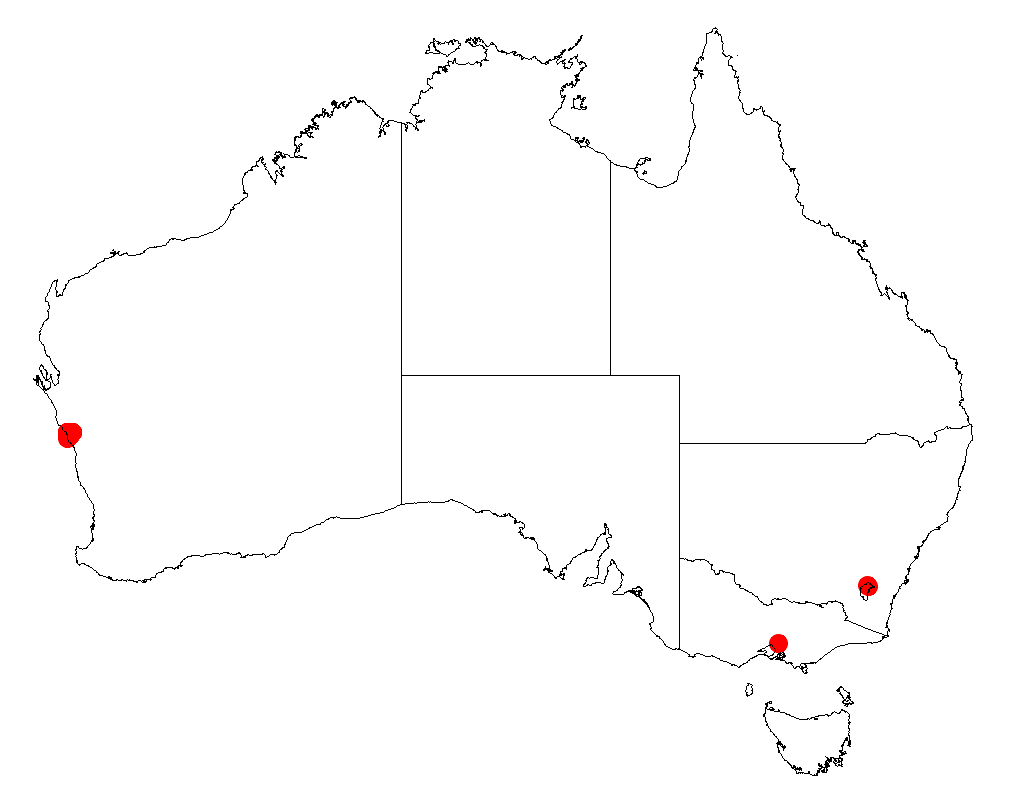
- Occurrence data from AVH

Synonyms
- Acacia lasiocarpa var. villosa (E.Pritz.) Maslin; Acacia pulchella var. villosa E.Pritz.; Racosperma guinetii (Maslin) Pedley

= Acacia guinetii =

Guinet's wattle

Species of legume

Acacia guinetii, commonly known as Guinet's wattle, is a species of flowering plant in the family Fabaceae and is endemic to the south-west of Western Australia. It is a spreading or spindly shrub with hairy branchlets, bipinnate leaves, spherical heads of golden yellow flowers and narrowly oblong pods.

== Description ==
Acacia guinetii is a spreading shrub that typically grows to a height of 0.3–1 m (1 ft 0 in – 3 ft 3 in) or a spindly shrub to about 2 m (6 ft 7 in) and has hairy branchlets that commonly arch downwards. It has a single pair of pinnae 4–10 mm (0.16–0.39 in) long on a petiole 1.0–1.5 mm (0.039–0.059 in) long. Each pinna usually has three or four pairs of pinnules 4–7 mm (0.16–0.28 in) long, 1–2 mm (0.039–0.079 in) wide and green with the edges turned down or rolled under. There is a sessile gland on the petiole at the base of the pinnae and sometimes at the base of the lowermost pair of pinnules. The flowers are borne in one or two spherical heads in leaf axils on a peduncle 10–25 mm (0.39–0.98 in) long and usually much longer then the leaves. Each head has 50 to 75 densely arranged golden yellow flowers. Flowering occurs from June to September and the pods are 20–40 mm (0.79–1.57 in) long and 3–4 mm (0.12–0.16 in) wide with oblong seeds 2.5–3.0 mm (0.098–0.118 in) long.

This species belongs to the Acacia pulchella group of wattles and resembles Acacia lasiocarpa.

== Taxonomy ==
Acacia guinetii was first formally described in 1979 by the botanist Bruce Maslin in the journal Nuytsia from specimens collected by Alison Ashby in the Moresby Range in 1972. The specific epithet (guinetii) honours Philippe Guinet for his many contributions to the study of Acacia pollen.

== Distribution and habitat ==
Guinet's wattle grows on lateritic hills in heath between Geraldton and Northamton in the Geraldton Sandplains bioregion of southwestern Western Australia.

== Conservation status ==
Acacia guinetii is listed as "Priority Four" by the Government of Western Australia Department of Biodiversity, Conservation and Attractions, meaning that is rare or near threatened.

== See also ==
- List of Acacia species
