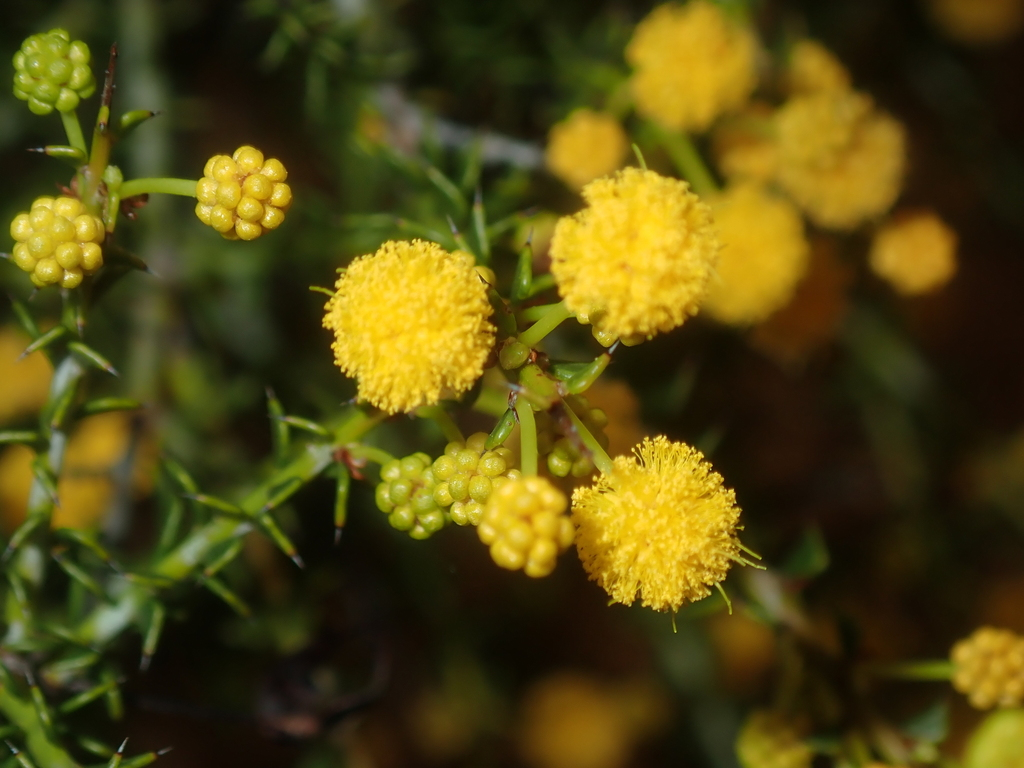
- Near Eurardy

Scientific classification
- Kingdom: Plantae
- Clade: Embryophytes
- Clade: Tracheophytes
- Clade: Spermatophytes
- Clade: Angiosperms
- Clade: Eudicots
- Clade: Rosids
- Order: Fabales
- Family: Fabaceae
- Subfamily: Caesalpinioideae
- Clade: Mimosoid clade
- Genus: Acacia
- Species: A. sphenophylla

Binomial name
- Acacia sphenophylla Maslin
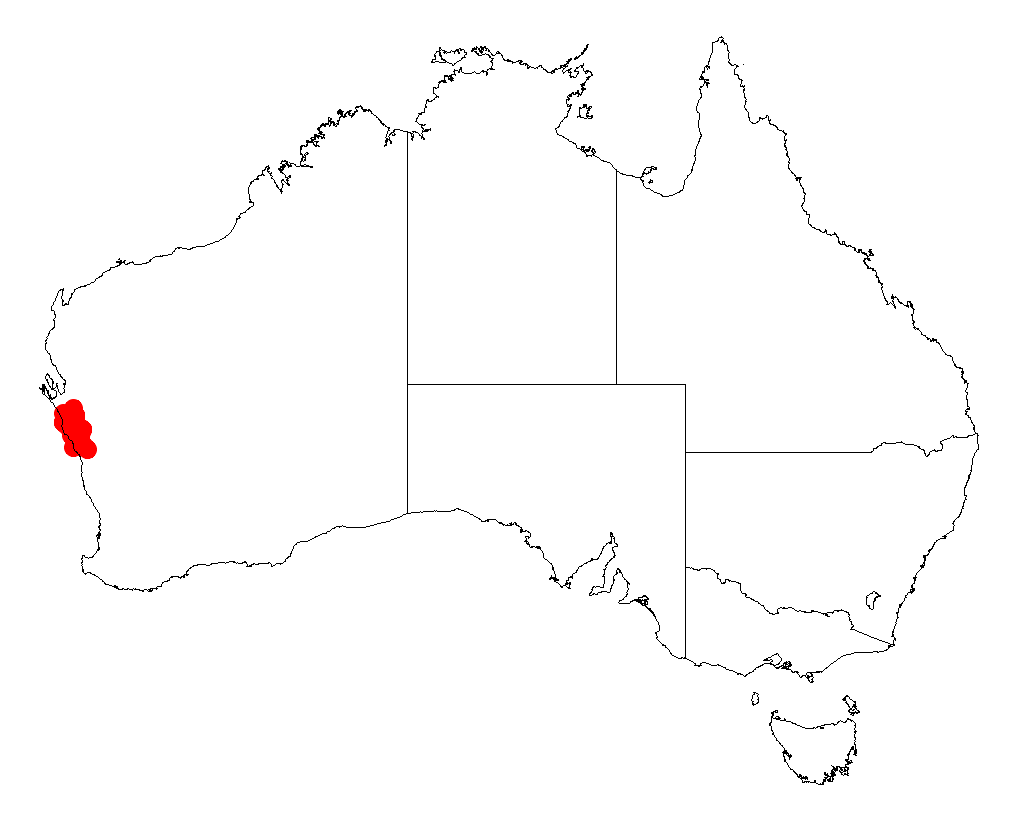
- Occurrence data from AVH

= Acacia sphenophylla =

Species of legume

Acacia sphenophylla is a shrub of the genus Acacia and the subgenus Phyllodineae that is endemic to a small area in western Australia.

== Description ==
The spreading, intricate pungent shrub typically grows to a height of 0.3 to 1.3 metres (1.0 to 4.3 ft). It has coarsely or sharply pungent branchlets that can be glabrous or quite hairy and covered with a fine white powder at the extremities. Like most species of Acacia it has phyllodes rather than true leaves. The ascending to erect and pungent phyllodes have an inequilateral wedge-shaped to obtriangular shape. The greaan and glabrous or sparsely haired phyllodes are 3 to 11 mm (0.12 to 0.43 in) in length and 1.5 to 5 mm (0.059 to 0.197 in) wide. It blooms from July to August and produces yellow flowers. The rudimentary inflorescences occur on single headed racemes along an axis that is less than 0.5 mm (0.020 in) long. The spherical to obloid shaped flower-heads contain 15 to 30 golden coloured flowers. Following flowering blacking coloured firmly chartaceous to thinly coriaceous-crustaceous seed pods form that resemble a string of beads. The coiled pods contain elliptic shaped seeds with a length of around 2 mm (0.079 in).

== Taxonomy ==
The species was first formally described by the botanist Bruce Maslin in 1999 as part of the work Acacia miscellany. The taxonomy of fifty-five species of Acacia, primarily Western Australian, in section Phyllodineae (Leguminosae: Mimosoideae) as published in the journal Nuytsia. It was reclassified as Racosperma sphenophyllum by Leslie Pedley in 2003 then transferred back to genus Acacia in 2006. It resembles and can be confused with Acacia acanthoclada subsp. glaucescens and is also similar to Acacia pravifolia.

== Distribution ==
It is native to an area in the Mid West region of Western Australia where it is often situated on low rises and sandplains growing in sandy or sandy-loam soils. The range of the plant extends from around Geraldton in the south to about 50 km (31 mi) north of the Murchison River where it is usually a part of mixed open scrub, tall shrubland or open heathland communities.

== See also ==
- List of Acacia species
