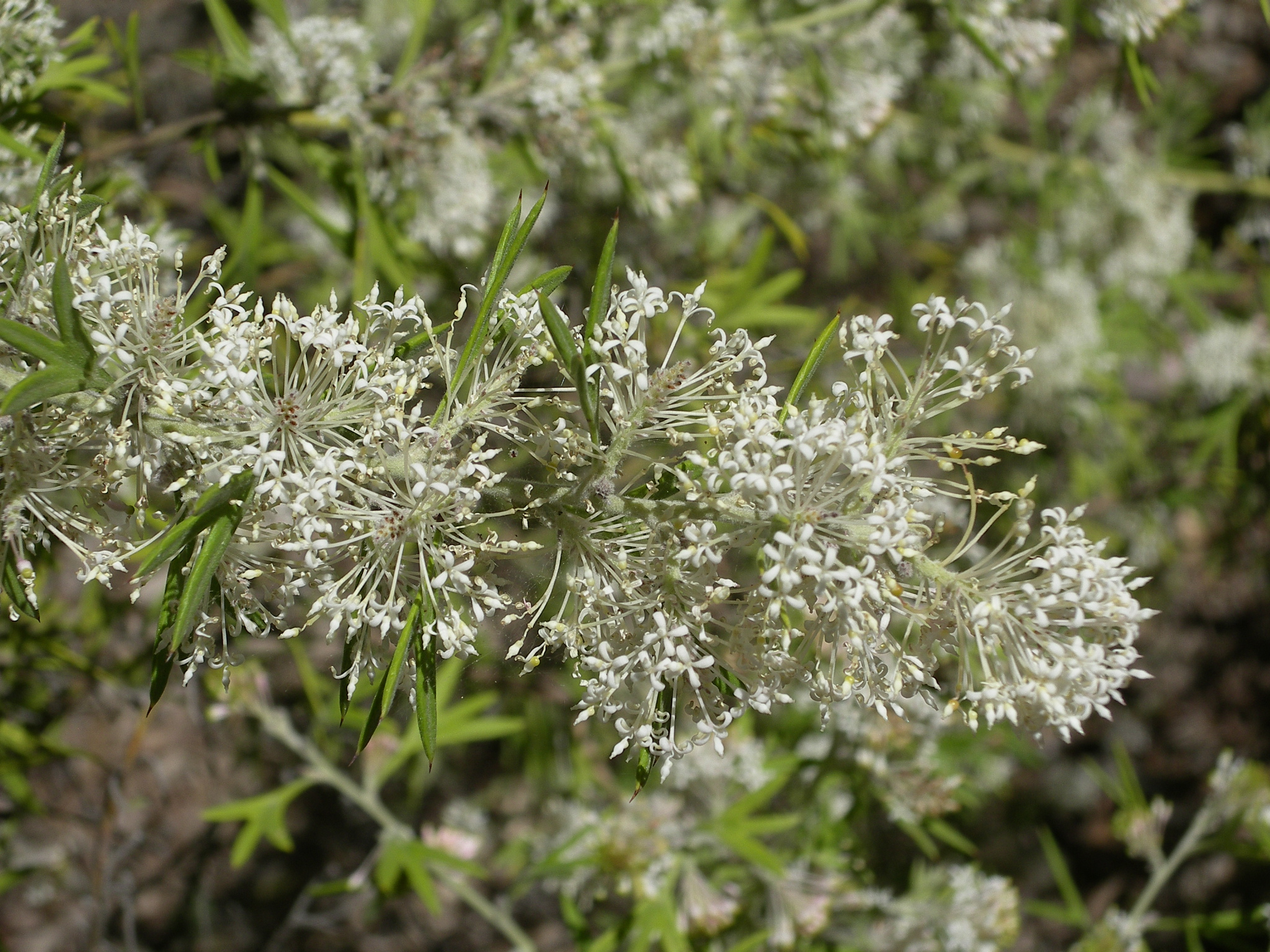

Scientific classification
- Kingdom: Plantae
- Clade: Tracheophytes
- Clade: Angiosperms
- Clade: Eudicots
- Order: Proteales
- Family: Proteaceae
- Genus: Grevillea
- Species: G. vestita

Binomial name
- Grevillea vestita (Endl.) Meisn.

Synonyms
- Grevillea vestita var. dilatata Meisn.; Manglesia vestita Endl.

= Grevillea vestita =

Species of shrub endemic to Western Australia

Grevillea vestita is a species of flowering plant in the family Proteaceae and is endemic to the south-west of Western Australia. It is an erect, spreading, prickly shrub with lobed leaves, the number and arrangement of lobes depending on subspecies, and more or less spherical to dome-shaped clusters of hairy, white to cream-coloured flowers sometimes tinged with pink.

== Description ==
Grevillea vestita is an erect, spreading, prickly shrub that typically grows to a height of 0.6–4.5 m (2 ft 0 in – 14 ft 9 in), and has woolly- to shaggy-hairy branchlets. Its leaves are mostly 10–40 mm (0.39–1.57 in) long and 6–35 mm (0.24–1.38 in) wide in outline, and lobed. Subspecies isopogoides mostly has 3 to 5 lobes, often divided again, the end lobes narrowly triangular and sharply-pointed. Subspecies vestita usually has 3 lobes or teeth, sometimes divided again, the end-lobes egg-shaped to triangular. The edges of the lobes are curved down or rolled under, sometimes enclosing the lower surface which is otherwise hairy. The flowers are arranged in spherical to dome-shaped clusters, the flowers nearer the base of the rachis flowering first. The flowers are glabrous, white to cream-coloured often with a pink tinge, the pistil 4.0–6.1 mm (0.16–0.24 in) long. Flowering mainly occurs from June to September or October and the fruit is a smooth, oblong follicle 8–10.5 mm (0.31–0.41 in) long.

== Taxonomy ==
The type specimen for this species was collected from King George Sound region and was described by Austrian botanist Stephan Endlicher in 1839 who gave it the name Manglesia vestita. In 1845 Carl Meissner placed the species into the genus Grevillea as G. vestita.

In 1986, Donald McGillivray described two subspecies of G. vestita in his New Names in Grevillea (Proteaceae), and the names are accepted by the Australian Plant Census:

- Grevillea vestita subsp.isopogoides F.Muell. ex McGill. has the end lobes of the leaves usually narrowly triangular and sharply pointed, the lower surface usually obscured, apart from the midvein.
- Grevillea vestita (Endl.) Meisn. subsp. vestita has the end lobes of the leaves egg-shaped to triangular or oblong, the lower surface mostly exposed and woolly- or shaggy-hairy.

Two former varieties of G. vestita are now regarded as separate species

- Grevillea vestita var. angustata Meisn. is now Grevillea curviloba McGill. subsp. curviloba
- Grevillea vestita var. stenogyne Benth. is now Grevillea stenogyne (Benth.) Makinson

== Distribution and habitat ==
Subspecies isopogoides grows in heath and scrub, mainly between Kalbarri, Three Springs, Mullewa and Mingenew in the Avon Wheatbelt, Geraldton Sandplains and Yalgoo bioregions. Subspecies vestita grows in heath or woodland between Badgingarra, Pingelly and Williams and in near coastal areas between Yanchep and Cape Naturaliste in the Avon Wheatbelt, Geraldton Sandplains, Jarrah Forest and Swan Coastal Plain of south-western Western Australia.

== Conservation status ==
Both subspecies of G. vestita are listed as "not threatened" by the Government of Western Australia Department of Biodiversity, Conservation and Attractions.

== Use in horticulture ==
This species is noted for being free-flowering and adapts well to cultivation. It can withstand moderate degrees of frost and humidity and responds well to pruning. It can be grown from seed, but is usually propagated by cuttings.
