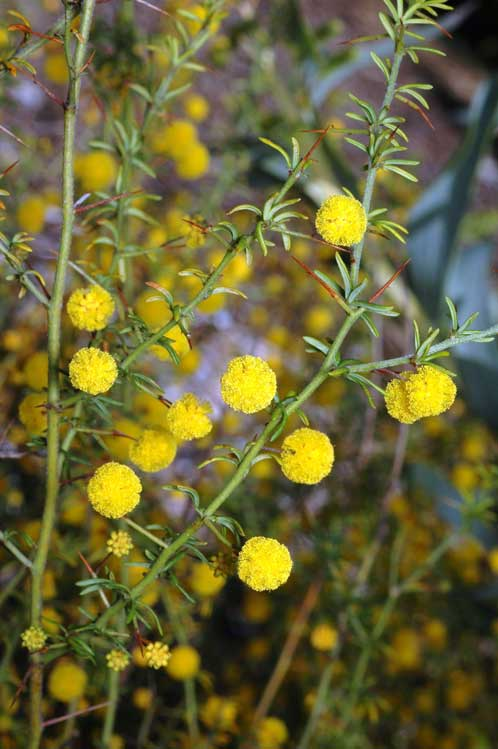
- In the Australian National Botanic Gardens

Conservation status
- Vulnerable (IUCN 3.1)

- Priority Three — Poorly Known Taxa (DEC)

Scientific classification
- Kingdom: Plantae
- Clade: Tracheophytes
- Clade: Angiosperms
- Clade: Eudicots
- Clade: Rosids
- Order: Fabales
- Family: Fabaceae
- Subfamily: Caesalpinioideae
- Clade: Mimosoid clade
- Genus: Acacia
- Species: A. epacantha

Binomial name
- Acacia epacantha (Maslin) Maslin
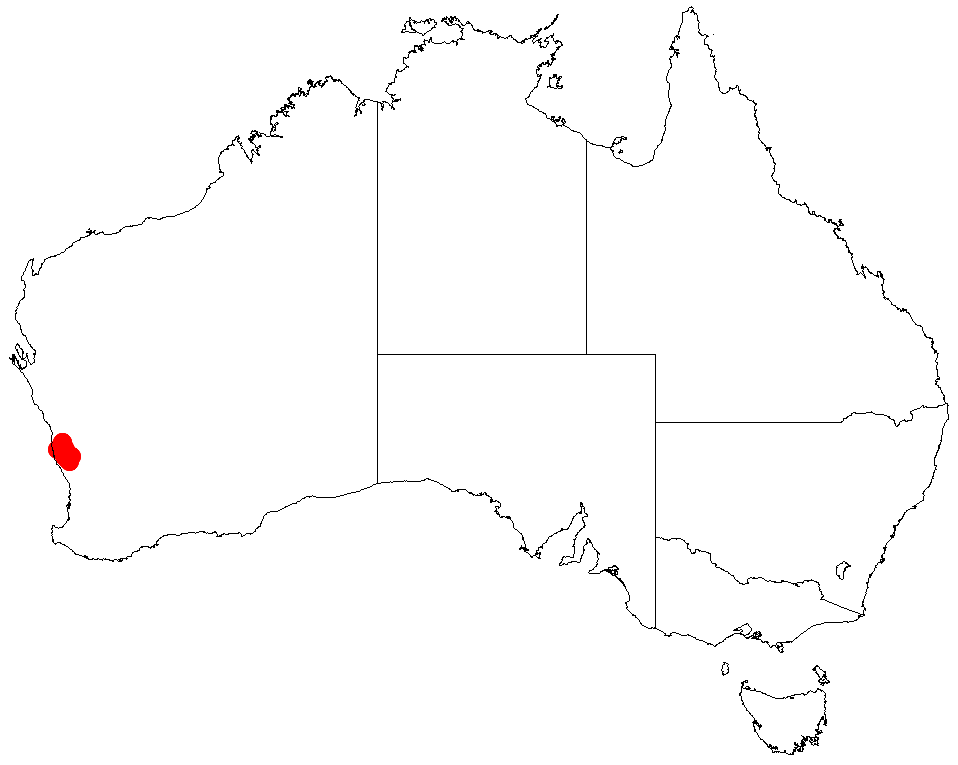
- Occurrence data from AVH

Synonyms
- Acacia lasiocarpa var. epacantha Maslin; Racosperma epacanthum Maslin (Maslin) Pedley

= Acacia epacantha =

Species of plant

Acacia epacantha is a species of flowering plant in the family Fabaceae and is endemic to the south-west of Western Australia. It is a dense, spreading shrub with bipinnate leaves with a single pair of pinnae, spines in the leaf axils, spherical heads of golden yellow flowers, and curved to coiled pods.

== Description ==
Acacia epacantha is a dense, spreading shrub that typically grows to a height of 30–50 cm (12–20 in). Its leaves are bipinnate with a single pair of pinnae 1–2 mm (0.039–0.079 in) long on a petiole usually longer than 0.5 mm (0.020 in). Each pinna has two pairs of leaflets 6–10 mm (0.24–0.39 in) long, 0.7–1.5 mm (0.028–0.059 in) wide, green and glabrous, with the edges rolled under. There are spines 10–20 mm (0.39–0.79 in) long in leaf axils. The flowers are borne in spherical heads near or above the middle of the axillary spines on a peduncle 7–10 mm (0.28–0.39 in) long, each head with 23 to 26 golden yellow flowers. Flowering occurs from July to August, and the pods are curved to coiled, 15–40 mm (0.59–1.57 in) long and 4–7 mm (0.16–0.28 in) wide and hairy. The seeds are oblong to circular, 2.5–3.5 mm (0.098–0.138 in) long.

This species of wattle is closely related to Acacia fagonioides, and both are unique members of the Acacia pulchella group in having inflorescences borne on axillary spines.

== Taxonomy ==
This species was first formally described in 1975 by Bruce Maslin, who gave it the name Acacia lasiocarpa var. epacantha in the journal Nuytsia from specimens he collected 15 km (9.3 mi) south of Badgingarra towards Dandaragan in 1973. In 1979, Maslin raised the variety to species status as Acacia epacantha in a later edition of Nuytsia. The specific epithet (epacantha) refers to the fact that the flowers are borne on the axillary spine.

== Distribution and habitat ==
This species of wattle grows in lateritic loam or clay in heath and open wandoo woodland and is restricted to the Eneabba-Dandaragan area in the Geraldton Sandplains and Swan Coastal Plain bioregions of south-western Western Australia.

== Conservation status ==
Acacia epacantha is listed as "Priority Three" by the Government of Western Australia Department of Biodiversity, Conservation and Attractions, meaning that it is poorly known and known from only a few locations but is not under imminent threat.

== See also ==
- List of Acacia species
