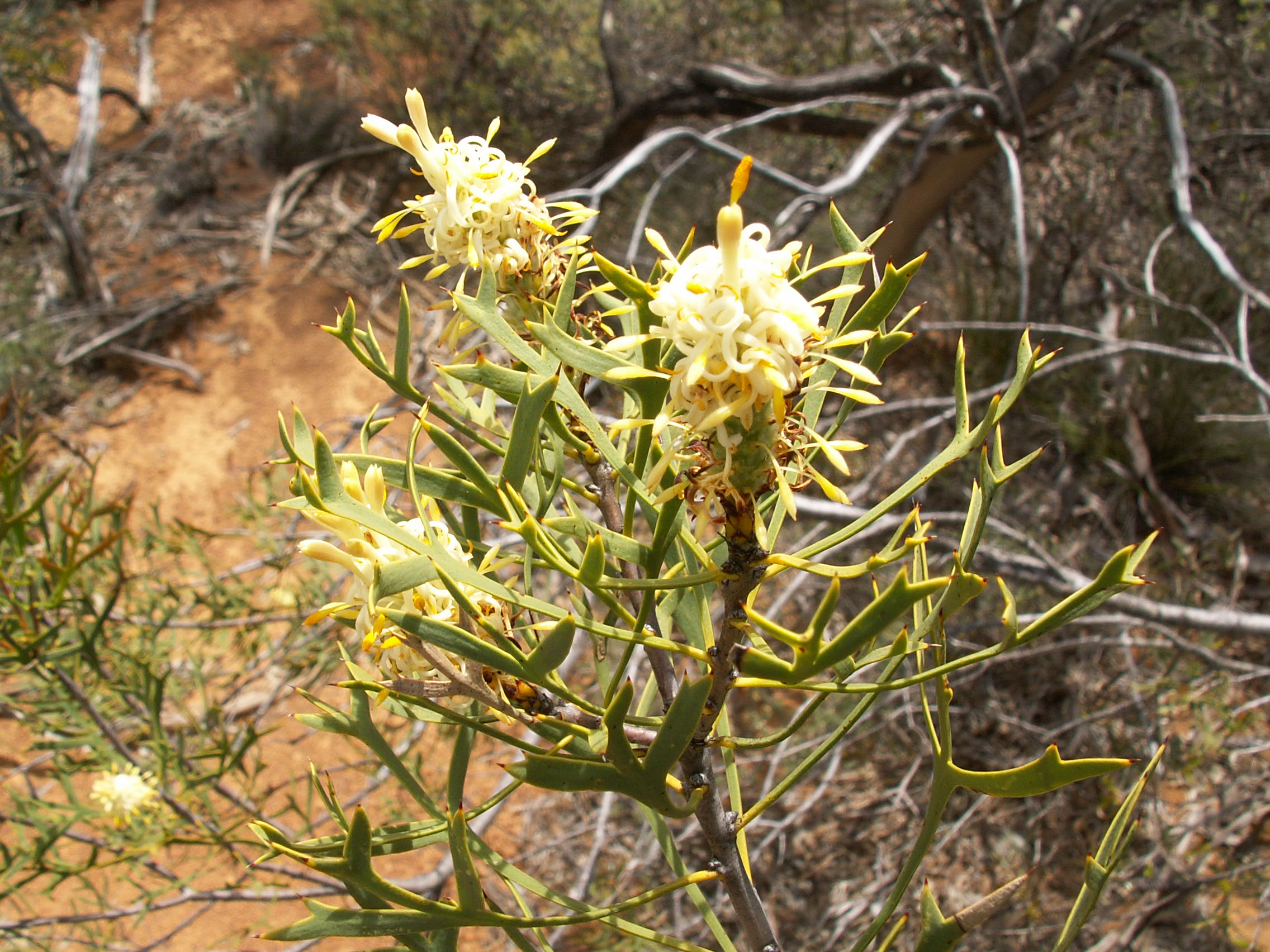
- In the Wongan Hills district of Western Australia

Scientific classification
- Kingdom: Plantae
- Clade: Embryophytes
- Clade: Tracheophytes
- Clade: Spermatophytes
- Clade: Angiosperms
- Clade: Eudicots
- Order: Proteales
- Family: Proteaceae
- Genus: Petrophile
- Species: P. shuttleworthiana

Binomial name
- Petrophile shuttleworthiana Meisn.

Synonyms
- Petrophila shuttleworthiana Meisn. orth. var.

= Petrophile shuttleworthiana =

Species of plant endemic to Western Australia

Petrophile shuttleworthiana is a flowering plant in the family Proteaceae and is endemic to the south-west of Western Australia. It is a prickly shrub with creamy-white flowers growing within a radius of about 400 km (200 mi) of Perth.

== Description ==
Petrophile shuttleworthiana is an upright, open shrub that can reach around 2 m (7 ft) tall. Its branches and leaves are glabrous, the leaves about 3.5–7 mm (0.1–0.3 in) long, deeply divided into between 3 and 7 rigid lobes, each with a sharp point on the end. Individual flowers are about 11 mm (0.4 in) long, cream, creamy white or yellow and glabrous. They are terminal (appearing at the end of stems) and appear in spring.

== Taxonomy and naming ==
The species was first formally described by Swiss botanist Carl Meissner in 1856 from a specimen collected in 1844 near the Swan River by James Drummond. The specific epithet recognises the English collector, botanist and malacologist Robert J. Shuttleworth. The closest relative of P. shuttleworthiana is Petrophile macrostachya.

== Distribution and habitat ==
Petrophile shuttleworthiana is found in the Avon Wheatbelt, Geraldton Sandplains and Swan Coastal Plain biogeographic regions from Moore River north to Kalbarri. It grows in heath, shrubland or mallee on grey-yellow sand, sometimes with gravel or laterite.

== Use in horticulture ==
Although its leaves and fruit are potential horticultural features, P. shuttleworthiana has not been seen in regular cultivation.
