= Acacia amputata =

Scientific classification
- Kingdom: Plantae
- Clade: Tracheophytes
- Clade: Angiosperms
- Clade: Eudicots
- Clade: Rosids
- Order: Fabales
- Family: Fabaceae
- Subfamily: Caesalpinioideae
- Clade: Mimosoid clade
- Genus: Acacia
- Species: A. amputata

Binomial name
- Acacia amputata Maslin
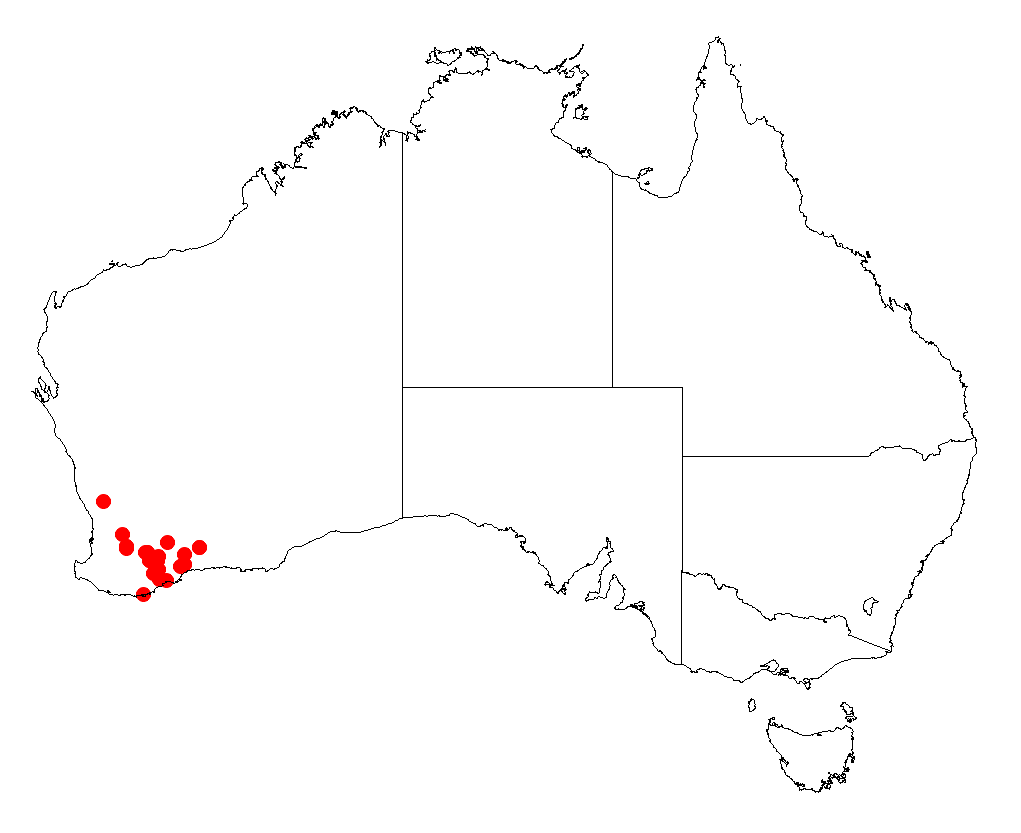

Synonyms
- Acacia pulchella var. subsessilis Maslin; Racosperma amputatum (Maslin) Pedley

Species of plant

Acacia amputata is a species of flowering plant in the family Fabaceae and is endemic to the south-west of Western Australia. It is a much-branched, spreading shrub with spiny branchlets, small bipinnate leaves, light golden flowers arranged in spherical heads of 10 to 20, and wavy or coiled pods up to 15 mm (0.59 in) long.

== Description ==
Acacia amputata is a much-branched, spreading shrub that typically grows to a height of 30–60 cm (12–24 in) and often has pinkish-brown branches, the branchlets spiny. The leaves are small with 1 pair of leaflets 1–2 mm (0.039–0.079 in) long each with 2 to 4 glaucous pinnules 1–2.5 mm (0.039–0.098 in) long and 0.5–1 mm (0.020–0.039 in) wide. The flowers are borne in spherical heads on a peduncle 1–2 mm (0.039–0.079 in) long of 10 to 20 light golden flowers. Flowering occurs from July to September and the pods are wavy or coiled, thinly crust-like, glabrous, up to 15 mm (0.59 in) long and 4–5 mm (0.16–0.20 in) wide. The seeds are brown, mottled black, broadly elliptic and about 2 mm (0.079 in).

== Taxonomy ==
In 1975, Bruce Maslin described Acacia pulchella var. subsessilis in the journal Nuytsia from specimens collected by Charles Gardner near Kukerin in 1934. In 1999, Maslin raised the variety to species status as Acacia amputata in a later edition of Nuytsia. The specific epithet (amputata) means 'to cut away, lop off, or shorten', referring to the short peduncles.

== Distribution ==
This species of Acacia grows in loan and sand in shrubland between Brookton, Narrogin, Frank Hann National Park and Boxwood Hill in the Avon Wheatbelt, Esperance Plains, Jarrah Forest and Mallee bioregions of south-western Western Australia.

== See also ==
- List of Acacia species
