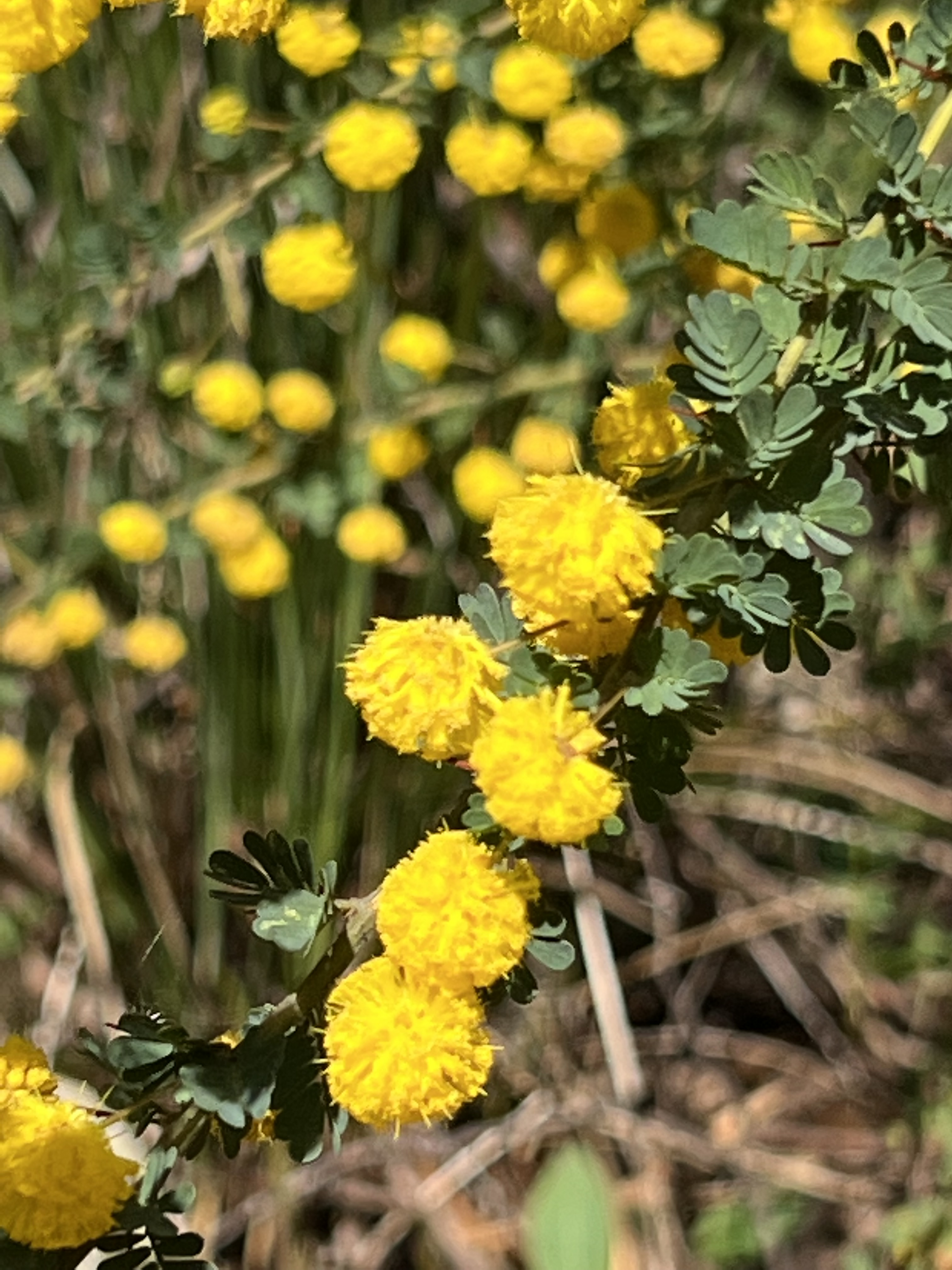

Conservation status
- Priority Three — Poorly Known Taxa (DEC)

Scientific classification
- Kingdom: Plantae
- Clade: Tracheophytes
- Clade: Angiosperms
- Clade: Eudicots
- Clade: Rosids
- Order: Fabales
- Family: Fabaceae
- Subfamily: Caesalpinioideae
- Clade: Mimosoid clade
- Genus: Acacia
- Species: A. megacephala

Binomial name
- Acacia megacephala Maslin
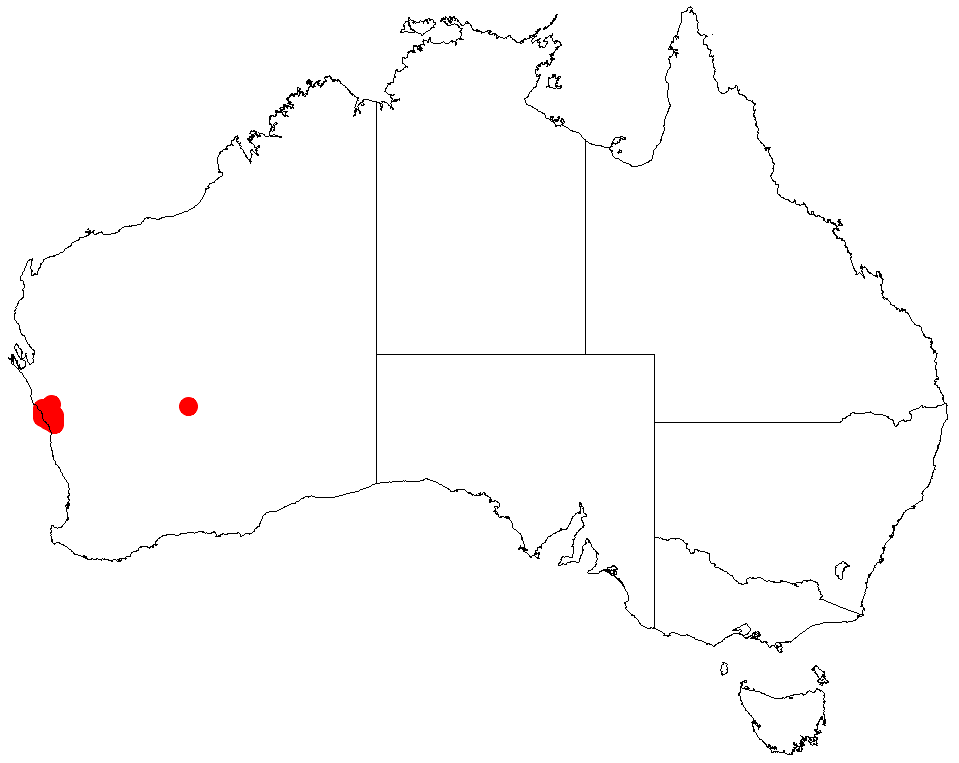
- Occurrence data from AVH

Synonyms
- Racosperma megacephalum (Maslin) Pedley

= Acacia megacephala =

Species of legume

Acacia megacephala is a species of flowering plant in the family Fabaceae and is endemic to the south-west of Western Australia. It is a shrub with hairy, often arching branchlets, bipinnate leaves, large spherical heads of golden yellow flowers, and linear to narrowly oblong pods.

== Description ==
Acacia megacephala is a shrub that typically grows to a height of 1–2 m (3 ft 3 in – 6 ft 7 in), and has hairy branchlets that often arch downwards. There is a spine, rarely two, in most leaf axils. The leaves are bipinnate on a petiole about 1 mm (0.039 in) long, with one pair of pinnae 4–6 mm (0.16–0.24 in) long, each pinna with four to six pairs of lance-shaped pinnules 3–6 mm (0.12–0.24 in) long and 1.5–3 mm (0.059–0.118 in) wide. The pinnules are green to almost glaucous, and there is a stalked gland 3–4 mm (0.12–0.16 in) long in the axil. The flowers are borne in one or two spherical heads in axils, on a peduncle 15–25 mm (0.59–0.98 in) long and much longer that the leaves. The heads are large, 8–10 mm (0.31–0.39 in) long at flowering time, and contain 80 to 90 densely arranged, golden yellow flowers. Flowering occurs from July to September, and the pods are linear to narrowly oblong, 25–50 mm (0.98–1.97 in) long, 4 mm (0.16 in) wide and glabrous. The seeds are oblong and 3–4 mm (0.12–0.16 in) long.

== Taxonomy ==
Acacia megacephala was first formally described in 1972 by Bruce Maslin in the journal Nuytsia from specimens he collected 19 mi (31 km) east of Geraldton towards Mullewa in 1970. The specific epithet (megacephala) means 'large-headed'.

== Distribution and habitat ==
This species of wattle grows on sandplains in sandy or loamy soils in mixed scrub and shrubland near Geraldton, in the Geraldton Sandplains bioregion of south-western Western Australia.

== Conservation status ==
Acacia megacephala is listed as 'Priority Three' by the Government of Western Australia Department of Biodiversity, Conservation and Attractions, meaning that it is poorly known and known from only a few locations but is not under imminent threat.

== See also ==
- List of Acacia species
