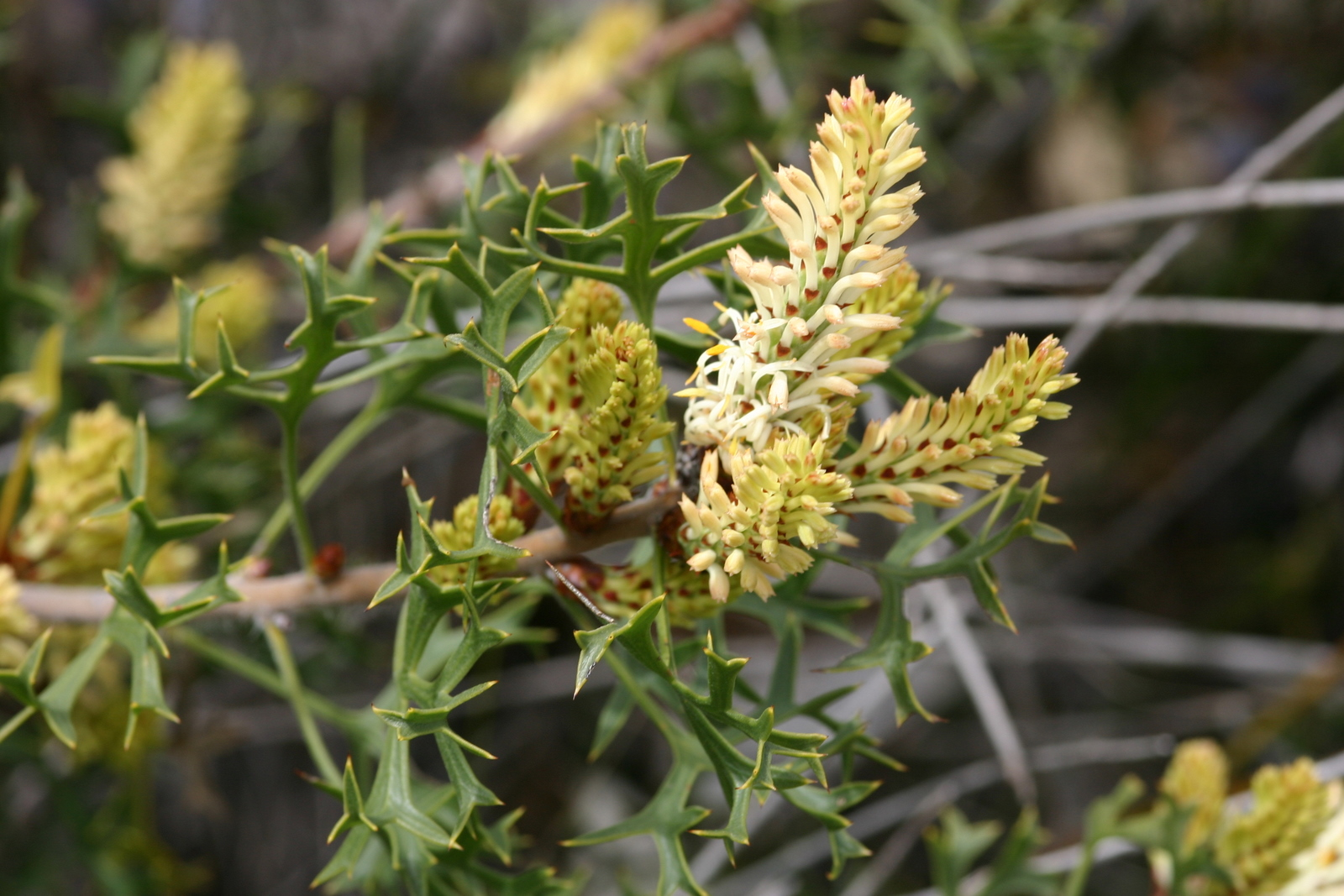
- Petrophile macrostachya, at Cottonwood Crescent Reserve, Perth

Scientific classification
- Kingdom: Plantae
- Clade: Tracheophytes
- Clade: Angiosperms
- Clade: Eudicots
- Order: Proteales
- Family: Proteaceae
- Genus: Petrophile
- Species: P. macrostachya

Binomial name
- Petrophile macrostachya R.Br.

Synonyms
- Petrophila macrostachya R.Br. orth. var.

= Petrophile macrostachya =

Species of shrub endemic to Western Australia

Petrophile macrostachya is a species of flowering plant in the family Proteaceae and is endemic to southwestern Western Australia. It is an erect shrub with prickly, pinnate or lobed leaves, and oblong or cylindrical heads of glabrous yellow to cream-coloured flowers.

== Description ==
Petrophile macrostachya is an erect, compact shrub that typically grows to a height of 0.5–1 m (1 ft 8 in – 3 ft 3 in) and has hairy grey branchlets that become glabrous with age. The leaves are pinnate or deeply divided, 30–80 mm (1.2–3.1 in) long on a petiole 20–50 mm (0.79–1.97 in) long, with between nine and seventeen prickly pinnae or lobes up to 30 mm (1.2 in) long. The flowers are arranged on the ends of branchlets or in leaf axils in sessile, cylindrical heads 20–60 mm (0.79–2.36 in) long, with overlapping, egg-shaped involucral bracts at the base. The flowers are about 9 mm (0.35 in) long, yellow to cream-coloured and glabrous. Flowering occurs from July to November and the fruit is a nut, fused with others in an oval to cylindrical head up to 65 mm (2.6 in) long.

== Taxonomy ==
Petrophile macrostachya was first formally described in 1830 by Robert Brown in the Supplementum to his Prodromus Florae Novae Hollandiae et Insulae Van Diemen from material collected by Charles Fraser near the Swan River in 1827. The specific epithet (macrostachya) means "long flower spike".

== Distribution and habitat ==
Petrophile macrostachya grows in heath, shrubland and woodland from the Kalbarri National Park to near Gingin in the Avon Wheatbelt, Geraldton Sandplains, Jarrah Forest and Swan Coastal Plain biogeographic regions.

== Conservation status ==
This petrophile is classified as "not threatened" by the Western Australian Government Department of Parks and Wildlife.
