= Acacia fagonioides =

Scientific classification
- Kingdom: Plantae
- Clade: Tracheophytes
- Clade: Angiosperms
- Clade: Eudicots
- Clade: Rosids
- Order: Fabales
- Family: Fabaceae
- Subfamily: Caesalpinioideae
- Clade: Mimosoid clade
- Genus: Acacia
- Species: A. fagonioides

Binomial name
- Acacia fagonioides Benth.
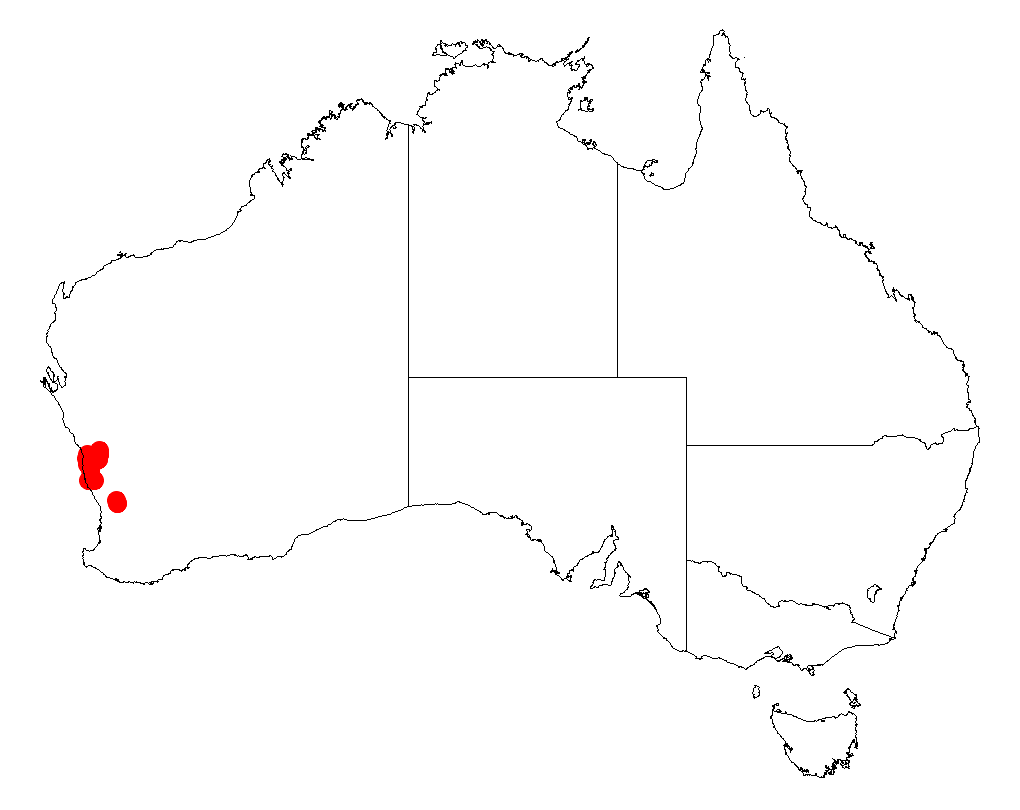
- Occurrence data from AVH

Synonyms
- Acacia pulchella var. fagonioides (Benth.) J.F.Macbr.; Racosperma fagonioides (Benth.) Pedley

Species of legume

Habit in the Flat Rock Nature Reserve, near Toodyay

Acacia fagonioides is a species of flowering plant in the family Fabaceae and is endemic to the south-west of Western Australia. It is an intricately branched, spiny shrub with bipinnate leaves, spherical heads of yellow flowers and glabrous pods.

== Description ==
Acacia fagonioides is an intricately branched shrub that typically grows to a height of 20–50 cm (7.9–19.7 in) and has spines 3–18 mm (0.12–0.71 in) long at the base of the leaves. The leaves are bipinnate with one pair of pinnae 2–5 mm (0.079–0.197 in) long, each pinna with two to four pairs of narrowly egg-shaped to narrowly oblong pinnules 2–5 mm (0.079–0.197 in) long and 1–2 mm (0.039–0.079 in) wide. The leaves are glaucous to subglaucous and glabrous to subglabrous and lack a petiole, but are on a stalk about 0.5 mm (0.020 in) long. The flowers are borne in spherical heads on the upper half of the axillary spines on a hairy peduncle 4–8 mm (0.16–0.31 in) long. Each head has 13 to 25 yellow flowers. Flowering occurs in June and July, and the pods are 30–80 mm (1.2–3.1 in) long, 7–12 mm (0.28–0.47 in) wide, glabrous and covered with a thin, powdery bloom. The seeds are elliptic to circular, inflated, 3–4 mm (0.12–0.16 in) long.

== Taxonomy ==
Acacia fagonioides was first formally described in 1842 in Hooker's London Journal of Botany from specimens collected in the Swan River Colony by James Drummond. The specific epithet (fagonioides) means 'Fagonia-like'. (The genus Fagonia is now considered to be a synonym of Zygophyllum.)

This species and Acacia epacantha are unique in the Acacia pulchella group of wattles in having their flowers borne on axillary spines.

== Distribution and habitat ==
This species of wattle grows in sandy heath near Eneabba and in lateritic soil in marri (Corymbia calophylla) forest at Toodyay and has a disjunct distribution near Eneabba, Cervantes and Toodyay, in the Avon Wheatbelt, Geraldton Sandplains and Jarrah Forest bioregions of south-western Western Australia.

== Conservation status ==
Acacia fagonioides is listed as 'Not threatened' by the Government of Western Australia Department of Biodiversity, Conservation and Attractions.

== See also ==
- List of Acacia species
