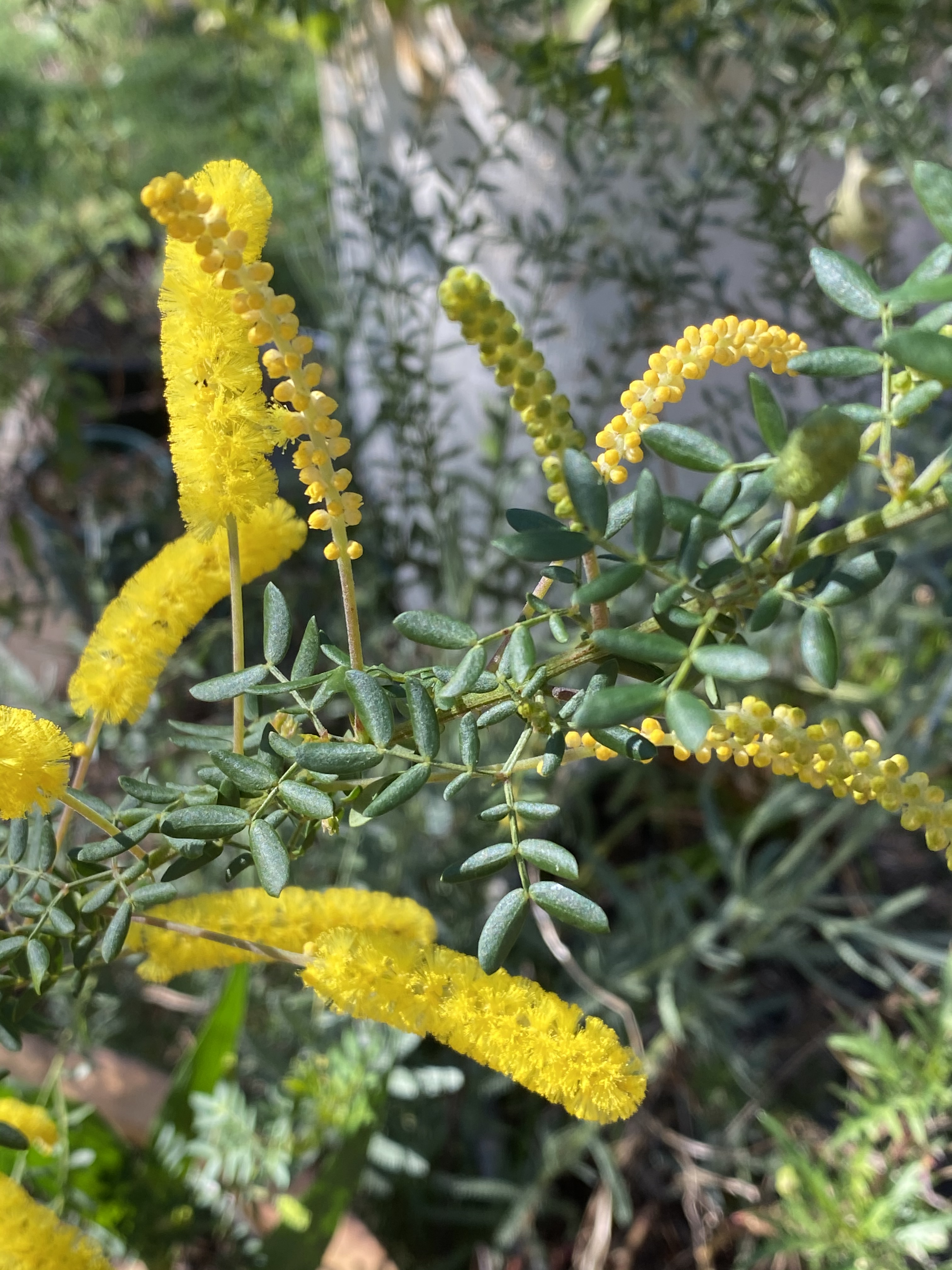

Scientific classification
- Kingdom: Plantae
- Clade: Tracheophytes
- Clade: Angiosperms
- Clade: Eudicots
- Clade: Rosids
- Order: Fabales
- Family: Fabaceae
- Subfamily: Caesalpinioideae
- Clade: Mimosoid clade
- Genus: Acacia
- Species: A. drummondii

Binomial name
- Acacia drummondii Lindl.
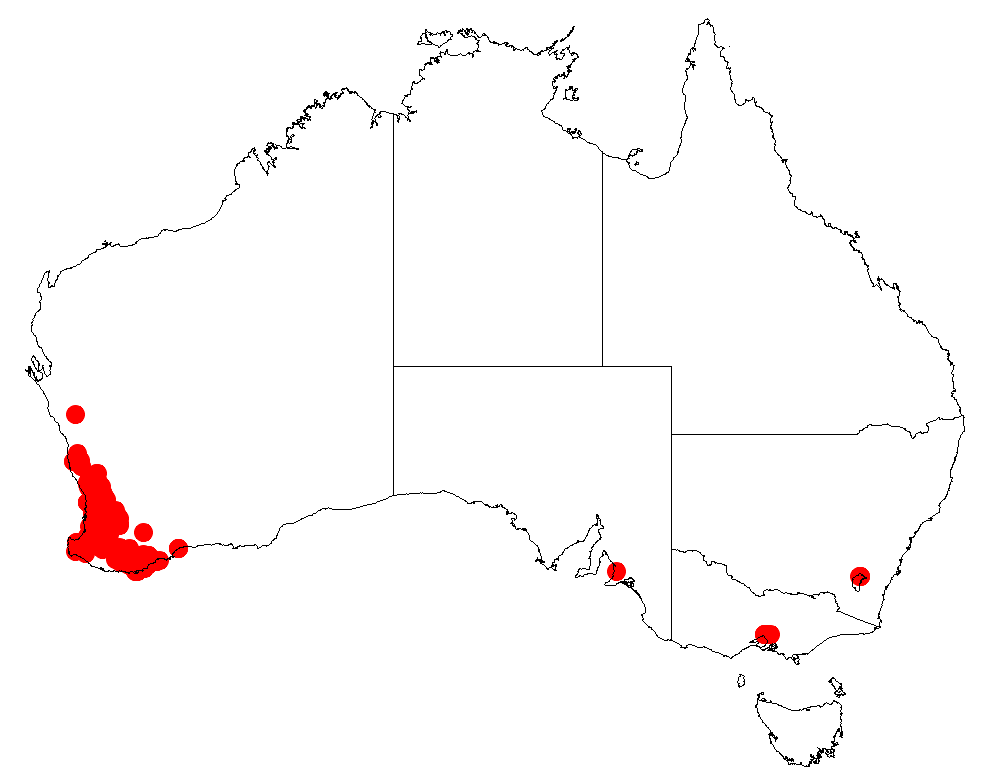
- Occurrence data from AVH

Synonyms
- Acacia drummondi Beaton orth. var.; Racosperma drummondii (Lindl.) Pedley

= Acacia drummondii =

Drummond's wattle

Species of plant

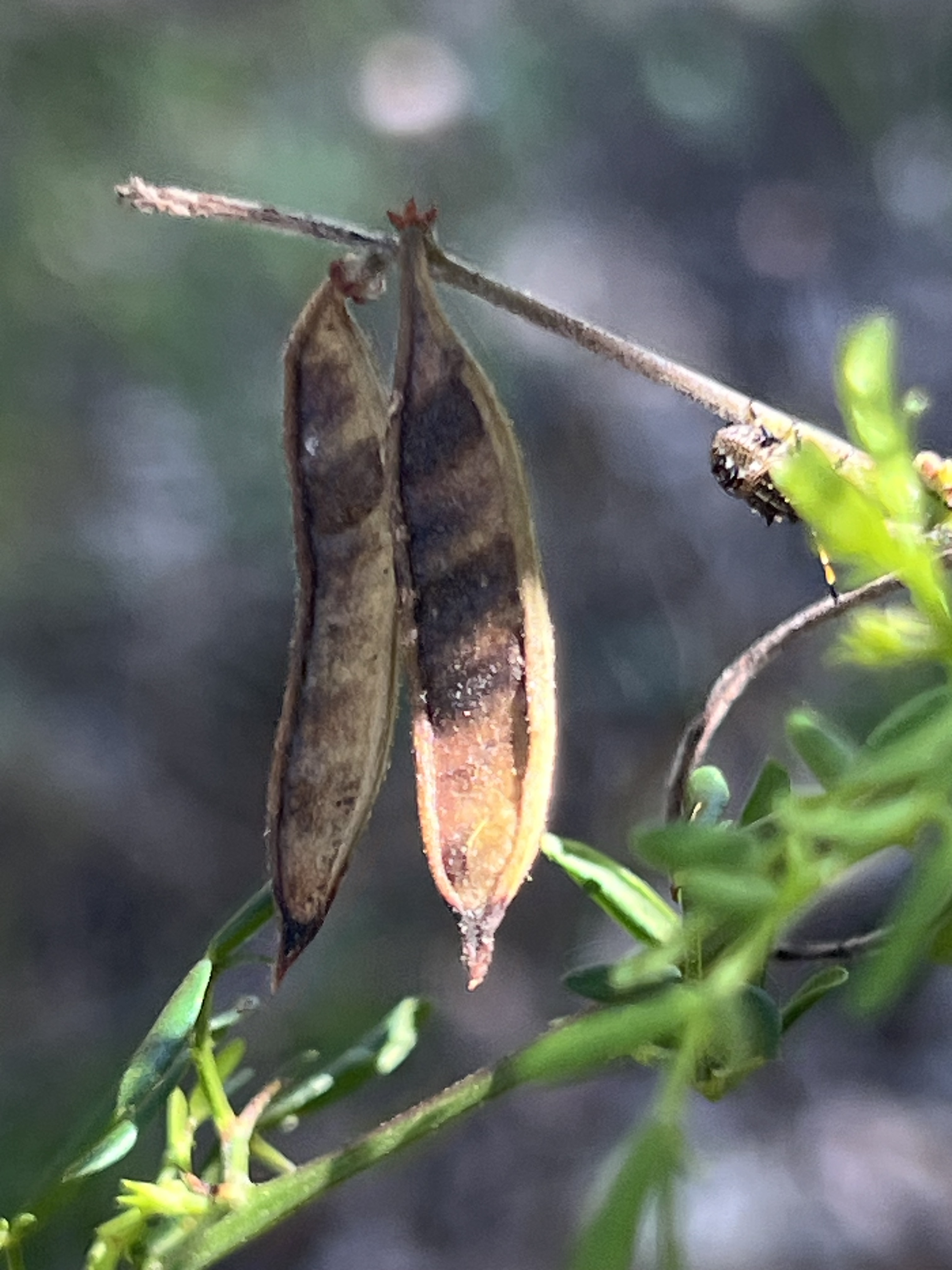
Pods

Acacia drummondii, commonly known as Drummond's wattle, is a species of flowering plant in the family Fabaceae and is endemic to the south-west of Western Australia. It is a shrub with bipinnate leaves, spikes of pale yellow to golden yellow flowers and narrowly oblong pods.

== Description ==
Acacia drummondii is a shrub that typically grows to a height of 0.3–2 m (1 ft 0 in – 6 ft 7 in). Is leaves are bipinnate on a petiole 0.5–5 mm (0.020–0.197 in) long, with up to four pairs of pinnae. The lower pinnae are 2–10 mm (0.079–0.394 in) long and the pinnae near the end are 4–20 mm (0.16–0.79 in). Each pinna has two or three lower pinnules and two to seven pinnules near the ends. The leaves are mid-green to slightly bluish green, smooth or densely hairy.

The flowers are pale to golden yellow, borne in single spikes 10–40 mm (0.39–1.57 in) long in leaf axils flowers and borne in leaf axils on a peduncle 10–30 mm (0.39–1.18 in) long. Flowering occurs between June and October, and the pods are narrowly oblong, rigid, dark or brownish-grey, 15–50 mm (0.59–1.97 in) long and 3.5–8 mm (0.14–0.31 in) wide. The seeds are elliptic to oblong 2–3.5 mm (0.079–0.138 in) wide.

== Taxonomy and naming ==
Acacia drummondii was first formally described in 1839 by the botanist John Lindley in his book, A Sketch of the Vegetation of the Swan River Colony. The specific epithet (drummondii) honours James Drummond, the Government Naturalist of the Swan River Colony.

Four subspecies of A. drummondii have been described and the names are accepted by the Australian Plant Census:

- Acacia drummondii subsp. affinis (Maslin) Maslin (previously known as Acacia varia var. affinis Maslin) is a shrub up to 1 m (3 ft 3 in) high, the leaves without a gland on the rachis, two to four pairs of pinnae, and green pinnules with the edges turned down or rolled under.
- Acacia drummondii subsp. candolleana (Meisn.) Maslin (previously known as Acacia candolleana Maslin) consistently has one pair of pinnae.
- Acacia drummondii Lindl. subsp. drummondii is a shrub up to 1 m (3 ft 3 in) high, the leaves without a gland on the rachis, and two to four pairs of pinnae, the pinnules glaucous and flat.
- Acacia drummondii subsp. elegans Maslin is a shrub up to 4 m (13 ft) high, the leaves with a gland on the rachis and sometimes on the petiole, and two to four pairs of pinnae.

== Distribution ==
Drummond's wattle grows from near Mount Lesueur, south to Albany and in the Fitzgerald River National Park. It grows among granite outcrops, in gullies and low lying areas and on hillsides in sandy and gravelly soils in the Avon Wheatbelt, Esperance Plains, Geraldton Sandplains, Jarrah Forest, Mallee and Swan Coastal Plain bioregions of south-western Western Australia.

- Subspecies affinis occurs near New Norcia and south to Bullsbrook, Western Australia.
- Subspecies candolleana has a sporadic distribution near New Norcia and south to Collie with a disjunct population in the Fitzgerald River National Park.
- Subspecies drummondii occurs from Moora to Boyup Brook in Eucalyptus wandoo woodland and near Mount Lesueur in heath.
- Subspecies elegans favours loam or sand in winter-wet places in forest and woodland in the Stirling Range-Albany area.

== Conservation status ==
Subspecies candolleana, drummondii and elegans are classed as "not threatened", but subsp. affinis is listed as "Priority Three" by the Government of Western Australia Department of Biodiversity, Conservation and Attractions meaning that it is poorly known and known from only a few locations but is not under imminent threat.

== See also ==
- List of Acacia species
