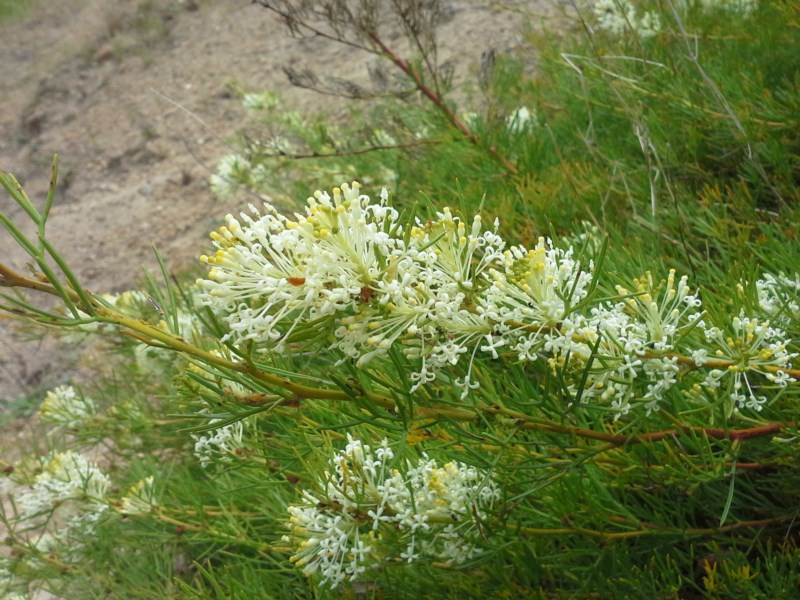
- A garden escape in the A.C.T.

Conservation status
- Critically Endangered (IUCN 3.1)

Scientific classification
- Kingdom: Plantae
- Clade: Embryophytes
- Clade: Tracheophytes
- Clade: Spermatophytes
- Clade: Angiosperms
- Clade: Eudicots
- Order: Proteales
- Family: Proteaceae
- Genus: Grevillea
- Species: G. curviloba

Binomial name
- Grevillea curviloba McGill.

= Grevillea curviloba =

Species of shrub endemic to Western Australia

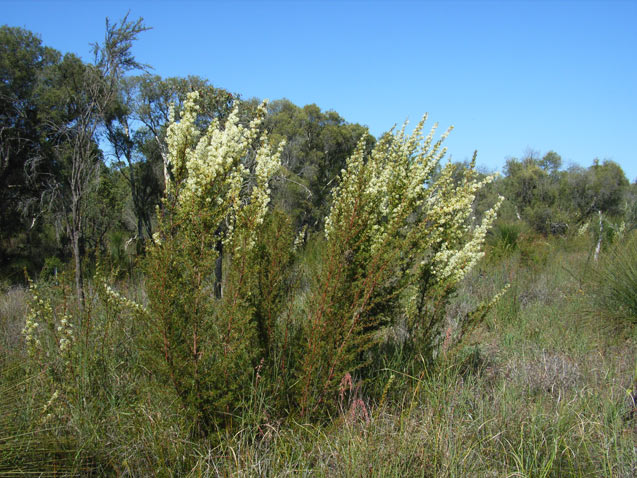
Habit near Muchea

Grevillea curviloba is a species of flowering plant in the family Proteaceae and is endemic to the south-west of Western Australia. It is a prostrate to erect shrub with short branchlets, divided leaves with linear to narrowly lance-shaped lobes with the narrower end towards the base, and white to cream-coloured flowers.

== Description ==
Grevillea curviloba is a prostrate to erect shrub that typically grows to a height of 0.1–2.6 m (3.9 in – 8 ft 6.4 in) and has short branchlets. Its leaves are mostly pinnatipartite, 10–50 mm (0.39–1.97 in) long and 10–15 mm (0.39–0.59 in) wide, with three to five linear to oblong or narrow triangular lobes 4–20 mm (0.16–0.79 in) long and 0.7–2.0 mm (0.028–0.079 in) wide with the edges turned down or rolled under. The flowers are arranged in dome-shaped to more or less cylindrical groups and are cream-coloured to white, the pistil 3.5–6.5 mm (0.14–0.26 in) long. Flowering occurs from August to October and the fruit is an oblong to elliptic follicle 10–13 mm (0.39–0.51 in) long.

== Taxonomy ==
This grevillea was first formally described in 1845 by Carl Meissner who gave it the name Grevillea vestita var. angustifolia in Johann Georg Christian Lehmann's Plantae Preissianae from specimens collected by James Drummond in the Swan River Colony. In 1986 Australian botanical taxonomist Donald McGillivray promoted the variety to species status, giving it the name Grevillea curviloba in his book New names in Grevillea (Proteaceae), the name Grevillea angustata having been given by Robert Brown to a different taxon in 1830.

In 1993, Peter M. Olde and Neil R. Marriott described two subspecies of G. curviloba in the journal Nuytsia and the names are accepted by the Australian Plant Census:

- Grevillea curviloba McGill. subsp. curviloba has simple leaves or leaf lobes 1.5–2.0 mm (0.059–0.079 in) wide and the pistil 3.5–4.5 mm (0.14–0.18 in) long;
- Grevillea curviloba subsp. incurva Olde & Marriott that differs from the autonym in having leaf lobes 0.8–1.2 mm (0.031–0.047 in) wide and curved inwards, the pistil 4.0–6.5 mm (0.16–0.26 in) long.

== Distribution and habitat ==
Subspecies curviloba grows in open shrubland in a small area near Bullsbrook and subsp. incurva grows in winter-wet heathland near Muchea.

== Conservation status ==
Grevillea curviloba subsp. incurva is listed as threatened by the Western Australian Government Department of Parks and Wildlife, and an interim recovery plan has been prepared. It has also been listed as critically endangered by the International Union for Conservation of Nature, due to a continuing population decline estimated to be greater than 80% within the last 150 years from threats including land clearing, competition with invasive weed species and canker disease.

== Use in horticulture ==
Grevillea curviloba is cultivated as an ornamental plant by plant nurseries, for use in gardens and drought tolerant landscaping. It is grown as a shrub with erect forms, or maintained as a 2 feet (0.61 m) by 15 feet (4.6 m) groundcover with prostrate forms.
