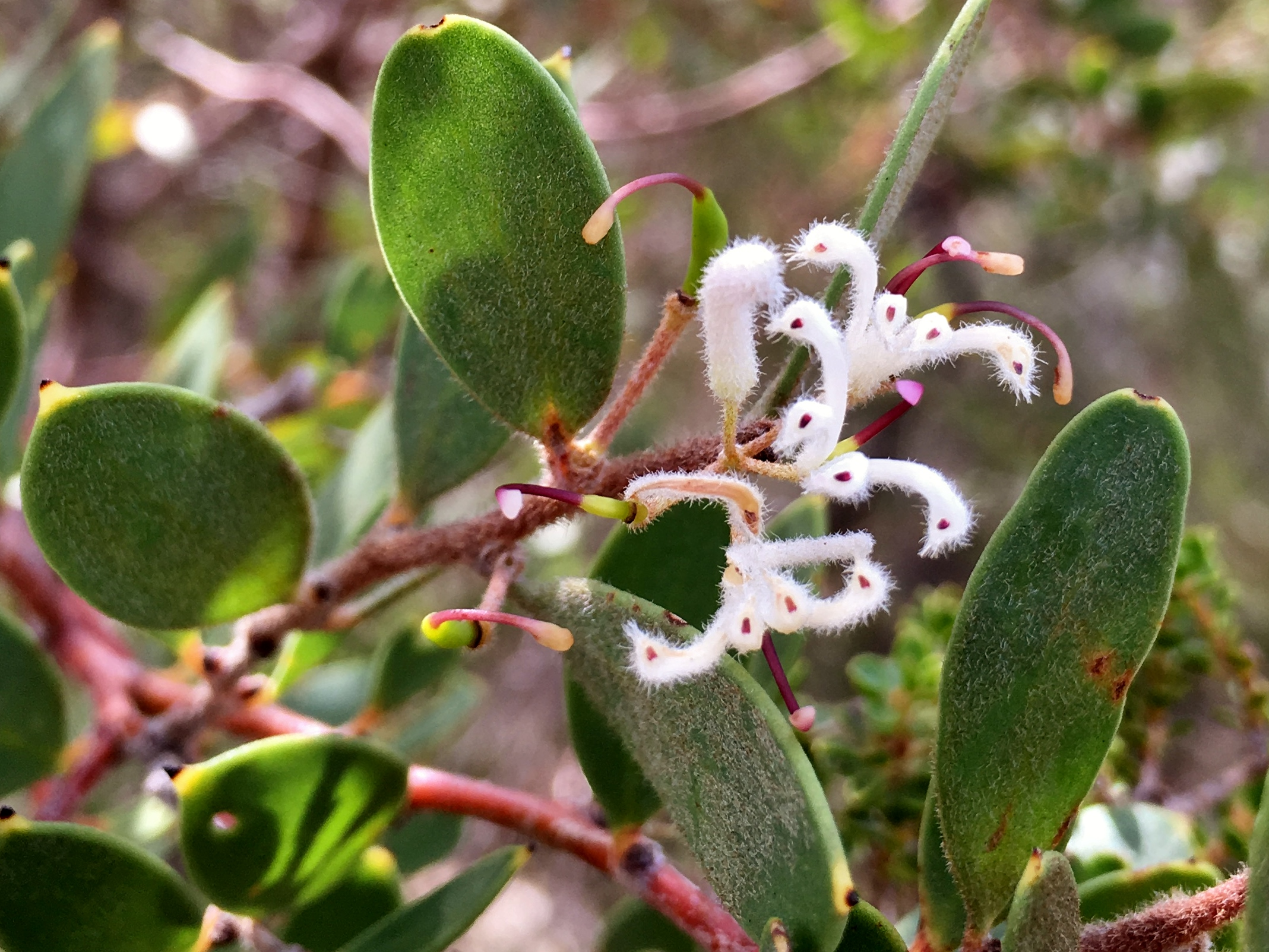
- Hakea lasiantha in the Stirling Range National Park

Scientific classification
- Kingdom: Plantae
- Clade: Tracheophytes
- Clade: Angiosperms
- Clade: Eudicots
- Order: Proteales
- Family: Proteaceae
- Genus: Hakea
- Species: H. lasiantha

Binomial name
- Hakea lasiantha R.Br.
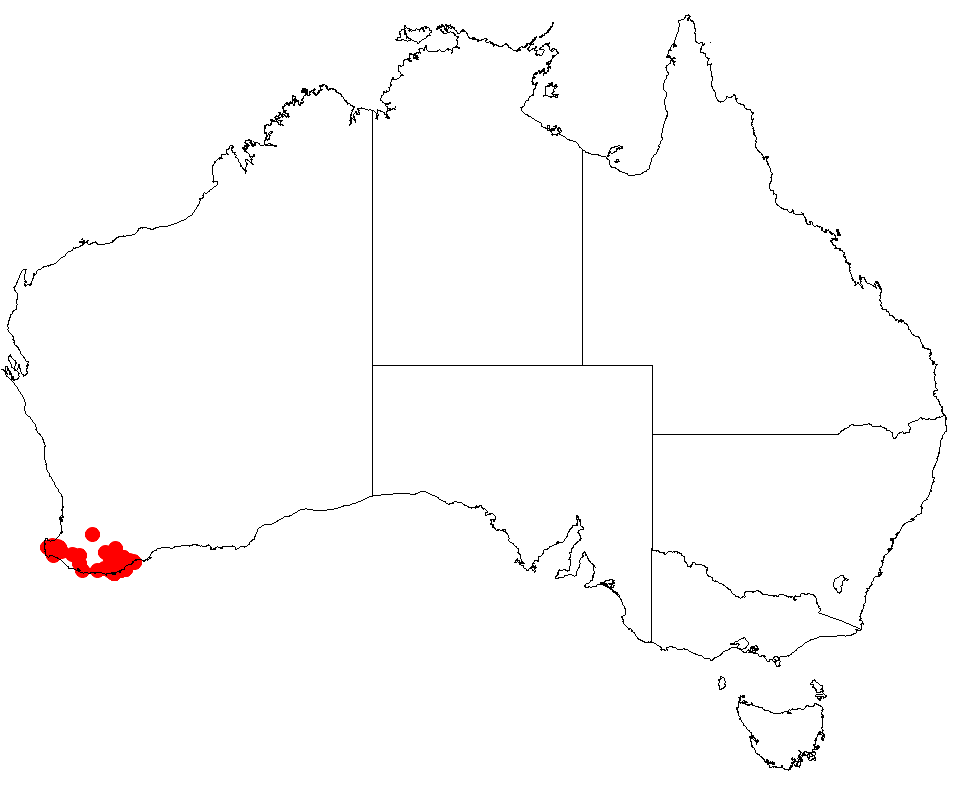
- Occurrence data from AVH

= Hakea lasiantha =

Species of shrub endemic to Western Australia

Hakea lasiantha, commonly known as the woolly-flowered hakea, is a shrub in the family Proteaceae endemic to an area along the south coast in the South West and Great Southern regions of Western Australia.

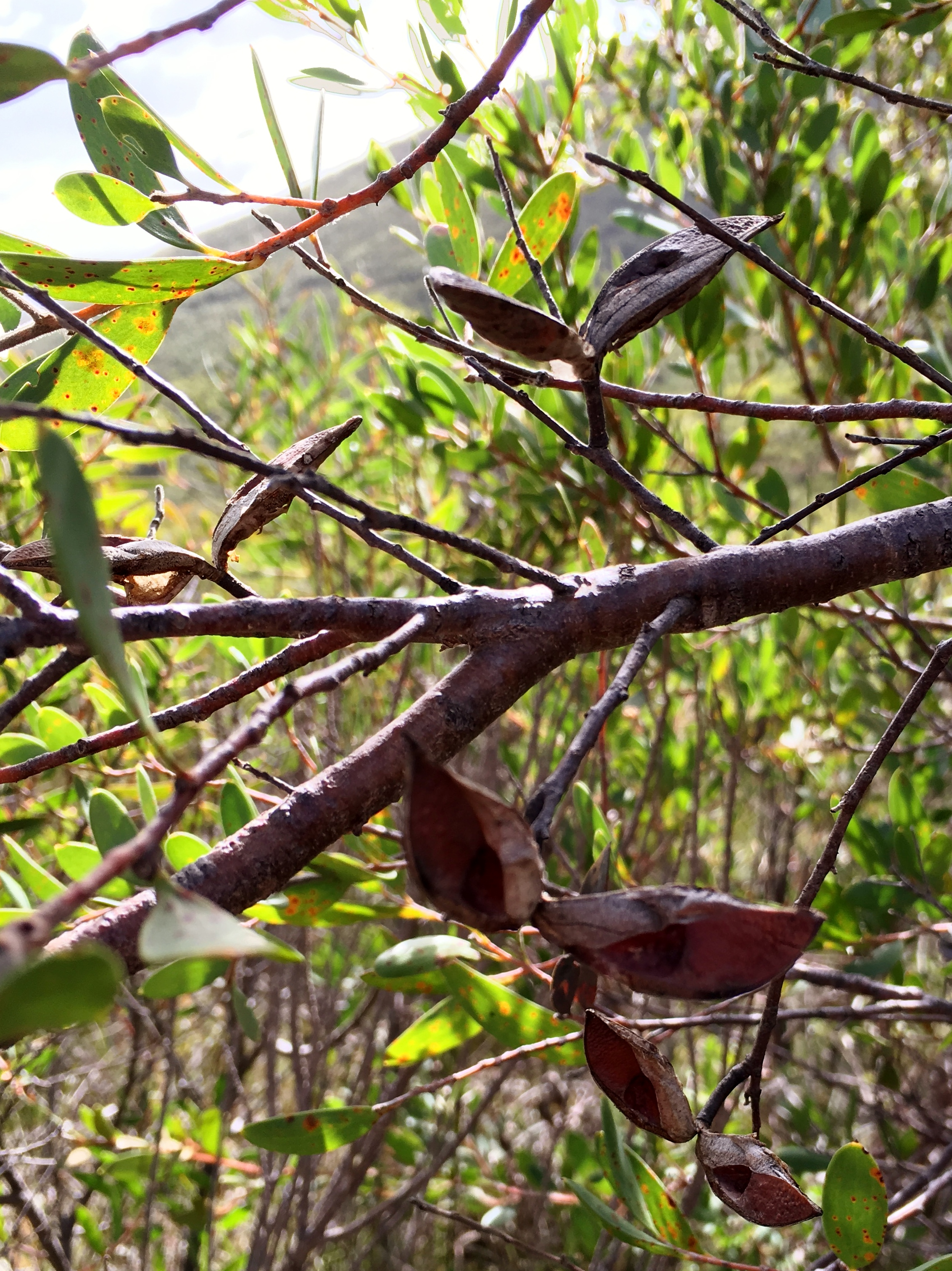
Hakea lasiantha fruit (opened)

== Description ==
The erect non-lignotuberous dense rounded shrub typically grows to a height of 0.6 to 3 metres (2 to 10 ft). It blooms from May to September and produces white flowers and have woolly white or yellowish brown perianths with a deep red style in clusters in the leaf axils. The leaves are flat, elliptic or obovate, about 3–6 cm (1–2 in) long by 0.7 cm (0.3 in) wide. Young leaves and branchlets are clothed in rusty-woolly hairs. The smooth narrowly elliptic fruit are normally 2.5–3 cm (1 inch) long and only a slight beak.

== Taxonomy and naming ==
Hakea lasiantha was first formally described by Scottish botanist Robert Brown in 1830. The specific name is derived from Ancient Greek words lasios (λάσιος) meaning "shaggy" and anthos (ἄνθος) meaning "flower", referring to the woolly flower structure.

== Distribution and habitat ==
This species prefers low lying wet depressions from the Stirling Range to Albany and along the coast to Ravensthorpe. It grows on sandy loam and gravel in heath and scrubland. It prefers a well-drained site with a sunny aspect and withstands salt laden winds. A good shade tree and windbreak that tolerates frost.

== Conservation status ==
Hakea lasiantha is classified as "not threatened" by the Western Australian government.
