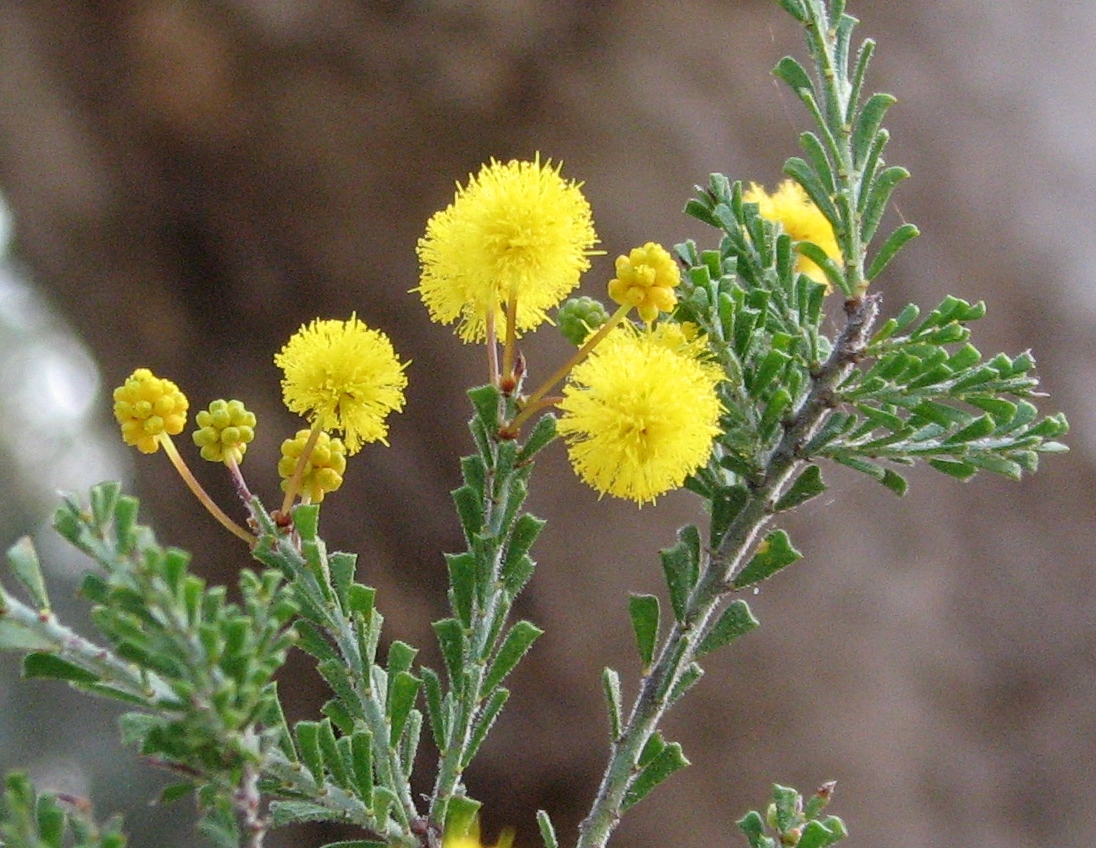

Scientific classification
- Kingdom: Plantae
- Clade: Tracheophytes
- Clade: Angiosperms
- Clade: Eudicots
- Clade: Rosids
- Order: Fabales
- Family: Fabaceae
- Subfamily: Caesalpinioideae
- Clade: Mimosoid clade
- Genus: Acacia
- Species: A. acanthoclada

Binomial name
- Acacia acanthoclada F.Muell.
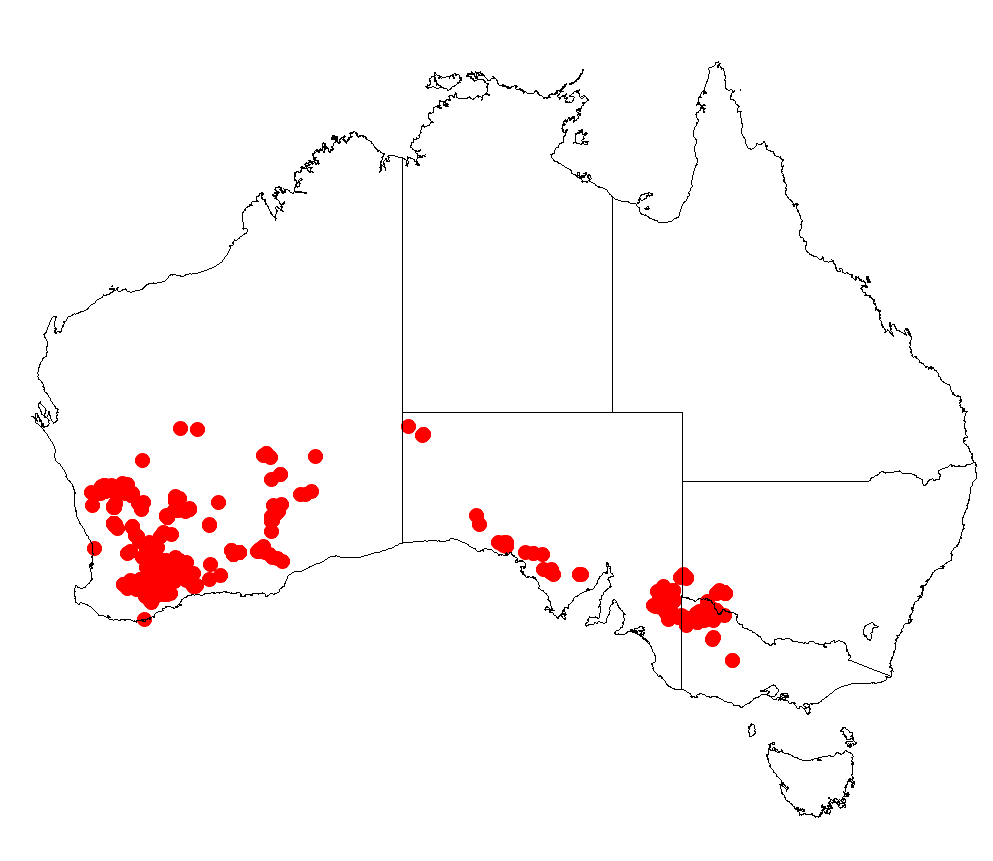
- Occurrence data from AVH

Synonyms
- Racosperma acanthocladum (F.Muell.) Pedley

= Acacia acanthoclada =

Harrow wattle

Species of plant

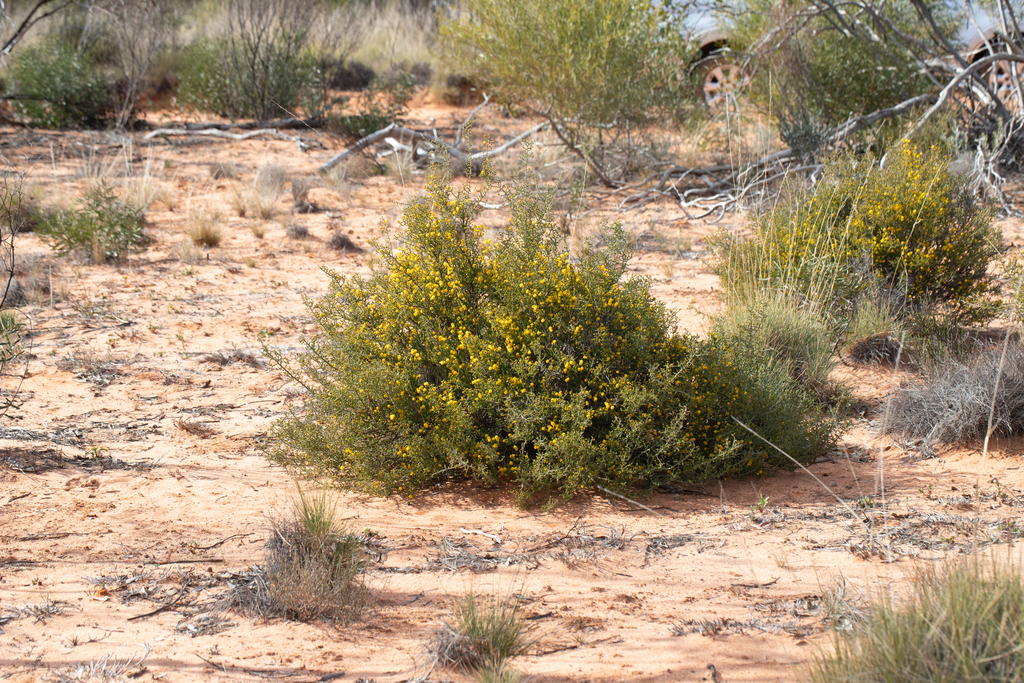
Habit in the Gluepot Reserve

Acacia acanthoclada, commonly known as harrow wattle, is a species of flowering plant in the family Fabaceae and is endemic to southern continental Australia. It is a low, highly branched, spreading and spiny shrub with wedge-shaped to triangular or egg-shaped phyllodes with the narrower end towards the base, and spherical heads of up to 30 flowers, and linear, spirally-coiled pods.

== Description ==
Acacia acanthoclada is a low, highly branched, spreading shrub that typically grows to a height of 0.3–2 m (1 ft 0 in – 6 ft 7 in), and has softly-white branchlets ending in sharp, tapering points. The phyllodes are erect, wedge-shaped to triangular or egg-shaped with the narrower end towards the base, 4–8 mm (0.16–0.31 in) long and 2–4 mm (0.079–0.157 in) wide. The flowers are borne in globe-shaped heads on a raceme 4–5 mm (0.16–0.20 in) in diameter on a peduncle 5–15 mm (0.20–0.59 in) long, the heads usually with 15 to 30 yellow flowers. Flowering occurs from July to December and the pods are linear but spirally coiled, up to 10–20 mm (0.39–0.79 in) long, 2.5–3.0 mm (0.098–0.118 in) wide, leathery, dark brown to black, and glabrous. The seeds are 2–4 mm (0.079–0.157 in) long with a thick aril.

== Taxonomy ==
The species was formally described in 1863 by Victorian Government Botanist Ferdinand von Mueller in his Fragmenta Phytographiae Australiae, based on plant material collected near Kulkyne.

In 1999, Bruce Maslin described two subspecies of A. acanthoclada in the journal Nuytsia and the names are accepted by the Australian Plant Census:

- Acacia acanthoclada F.Muell. subsp. acanthoclada has green phyllodes, or if glaucous, then not wider that 1 mm (0.039 in), the phyllodes glabrous or hairy, with seeds 2.1–2.5 mm (0.083–0.098 in) long.
- Acacia acanthoclada subsp. glaucescens Maslin has glaucous or more or less glaucous phyllodes, 2–4 mm (0.079–0.157 in) wide, the phyllodes glabrous, with seeds 3.5–4.0 mm (0.14–0.16 in) long.

== Distribution and habitat ==
Harrow wattle grows in a variety of vegetation types and is relatively common in Western Australia, South Australia, Victoria and New South Wales.

- Subspecies acanthoclada is widespread in southern Australia from near Wubin through South Australia to north-western Victoria and Dareton in the south-west of western New South Wales.
- Subspecies glaucescens is restricted to scattered locations in south-western Western Australia, and is found in the Koolanooka Hills 20 km (12 mi) east of Morawa, Evanston about 110 km (68 mi) north of Koolyanobbing and Mount Correll about 60 km (37 mi) west-north-west of Koolyanobbing.

== Conservation status ==
Both subspecies of Acacia acanthoclada are listed as "not threatened" by the Western Australian Government Department of Biodiversity, Conservation and Attractions, but subsp. acanthoclada is listed as "endangered" under the New South Wales Government Biodiversity Conservation Act 2016.

== See also ==
- List of Acacia species
