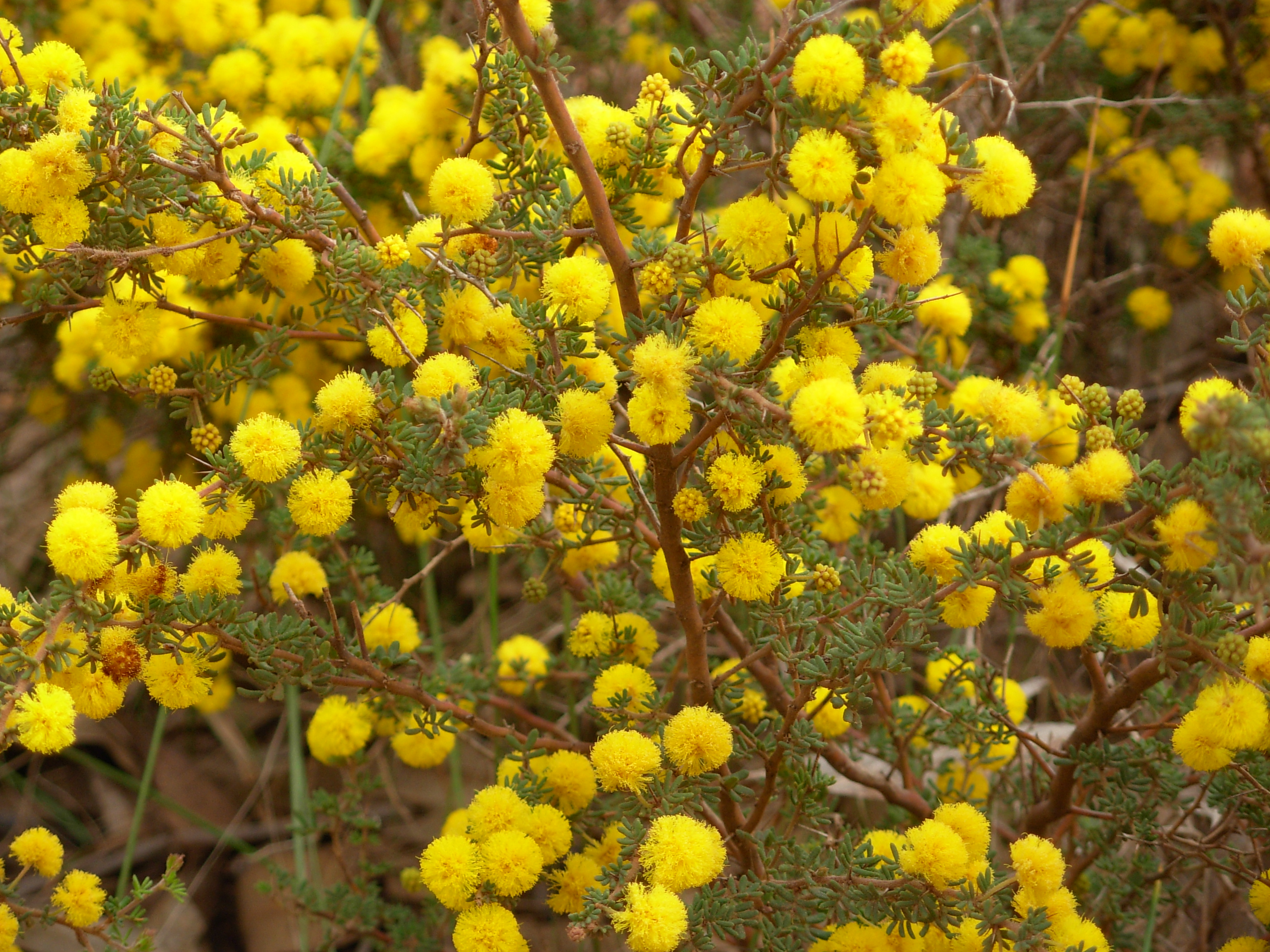

Scientific classification
- Kingdom: Plantae
- Clade: Embryophytes
- Clade: Tracheophytes
- Clade: Spermatophytes
- Clade: Angiosperms
- Clade: Eudicots
- Clade: Rosids
- Order: Fabales
- Family: Fabaceae
- Subfamily: Caesalpinioideae
- Clade: Mimosoid clade
- Genus: Acacia
- Species: A. lasiocarpa

Binomial name
- Acacia lasiocarpa Benth.
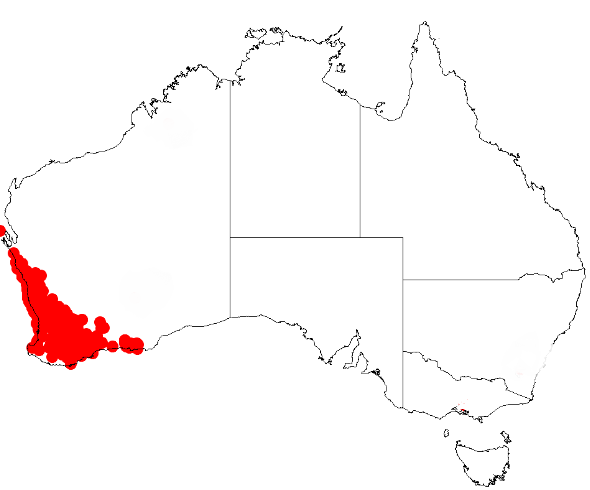
- Occurrence data from AVH

Synonyms
- Racosperma lasiocarpum (Benth.) Pedley

= Acacia lasiocarpa =

Panjang

Species of legume

Acacia lasiocarpa, commonly known as dune Moses and known by the Noongar peoples as panjang or pajang, is a species of flowering plant in the family Fabaceae and is endemic to the south-west of Western Australia. It is a shrub, often with spiny branchlets, with pinnatipartite leaves, usually with spherical heads of golden yellow flowers and flat or wavy pods.

== Description ==
Acacia lasiocarpa is a shrub that typically grows to a height of 0.15–1.5 m (5.9 in – 4 ft 11.1 in) and has branchlets with up to a single spine per leaf base, or sometimes a few or none. The leaves are pinnatipartite, with one pair of pinnae 1–10 mm (0.039–0.394 in) long on a petiole up to about 0.5 mm (0.020 in) long. Each pinna has two to eight pairs of pinnules 1–5 mm (0.039–0.197 in) long, 0.5–1 mm (0.020–0.039 in) wide, usually green, sometimes hairy, with the edges turned down or rolled under. There is a stalked gland up to 0.5 mm (0.020 in) long in the axils of the pinnae. The flowers are borne in one or two usually spherical heads on peduncles 2–12 mm (0.079–0.472 in) long, each head with 16 to 50 golden yellow flowers.

== Taxonomy ==
Acacia lasiocarpa was first formally described in 1837 by the George Bentham in Enumeratio plantarum quas in Novae Hollandiae ora austro-occidentali ad fluvium Cygnorum et in sinu Regis Georgii collegit Carolus Liber Baro de Hügel from specimens collected in the Swan River Colony by Charles von Hügel. The specific epithet (lasiocarpa) means 'woolly-fruited'.

In 1975, Bruce Maslin described five varieties of A. lasiocarpa in the journal Nuytsia, and the Australian Plant Census accepts three varieties:

- Acacia lasiocarpa var. bracteolata Maslin has two to three pairs of pinnules 2–5 mm (0.079–0.197 in) long, the pinnae 2–6 mm (0.079–0.236 in) long, heads of 16 to 27 flowers from June to October, and glabrous, more or less flat pods.
- Acacia lasiocarpa Benth. var. lasiocarpa has four to eight pairs of pinnules, the pinnae 3–10 mm (0.12–0.39 in) long, heads of 25 to 50 flowers from June to October.
- Acacia lasiocarpa var. sedifolia (Meisn.) Maslin (previously known as Acacia cygnorum var. sedifolia Meisn.) has two to three pairs of pinnules 1–2 mm (0.039–0.079 in) long, the pinnae 2–6 mm (0.079–0.236 in) long, heads of 16 to 27 flowers from June to September, and hairy, wavy pods,.

== Distribution and habitat ==
This species of wattle in widespread in the south-west of Western Australia, from Kalbarri to near Esperance.

- Var. bracteolata is widespread from near Eneabba and Harvey and south-east to Amelup and near Esperance.
- Var. lasiocarpa occurs from Kalbarri and south to Mandurah, also at Bunbury, extending inland to Coorow.
- Var. sedifolia occurs from Carnamah south to the Stirling Range and Fitzgerald River National Park.

== Conservation status ==
Acacia lasiocarpa and all three varieties are listed as 'not threatened' by the Government of Western Australia Department of Biodiversity, Conservation and Attractions.

== See also ==
- List of Acacia species
