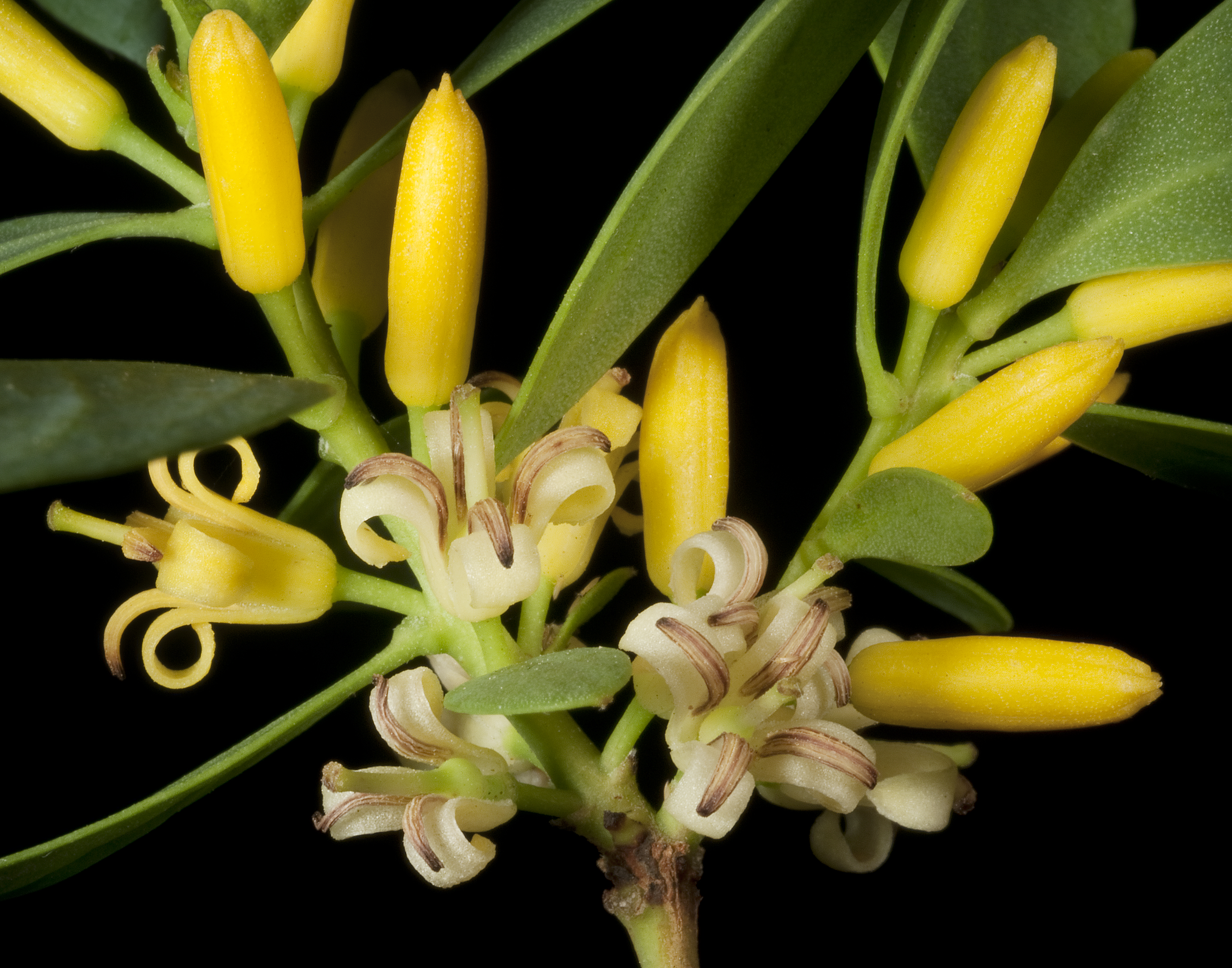

Scientific classification
- Kingdom: Plantae
- Clade: Tracheophytes
- Clade: Angiosperms
- Clade: Eudicots
- Order: Proteales
- Family: Proteaceae
- Genus: Persoonia
- Species: P. elliptica

Binomial name
- Persoonia elliptica R.Br.
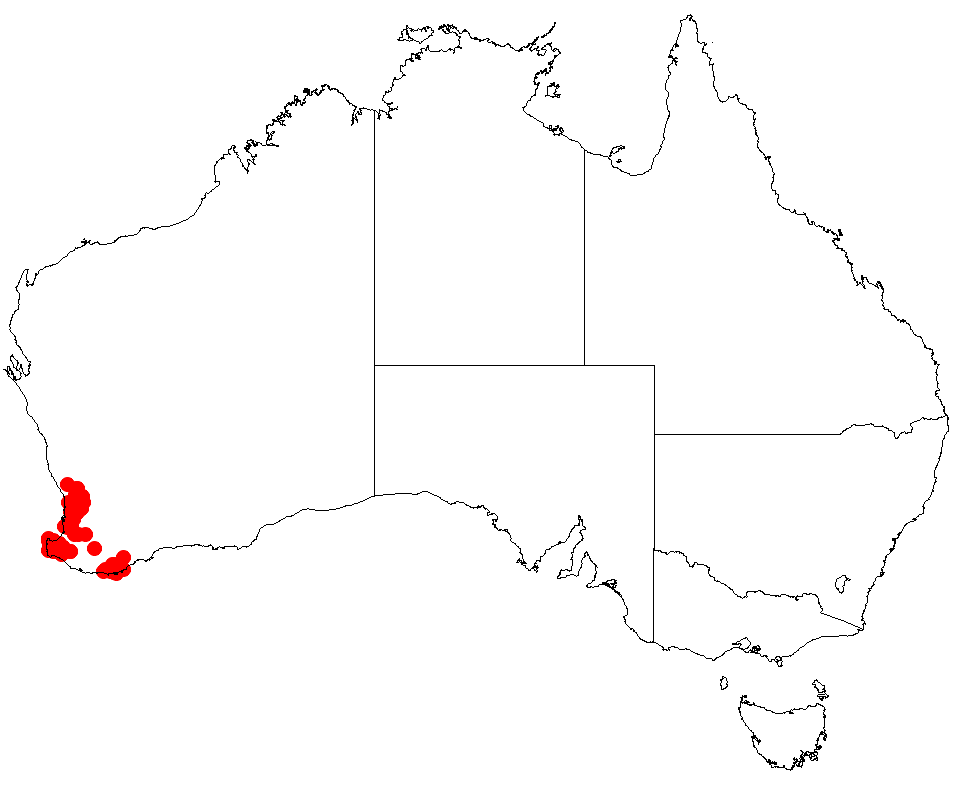
- Occurrence data from Australasian Virtual Herbarium

Synonyms
- Linkia elliptica (R.Br.) Kuntze; Persoonia laureola Lindl.

= Persoonia elliptica =

Snottygobble

Species of flowering plant

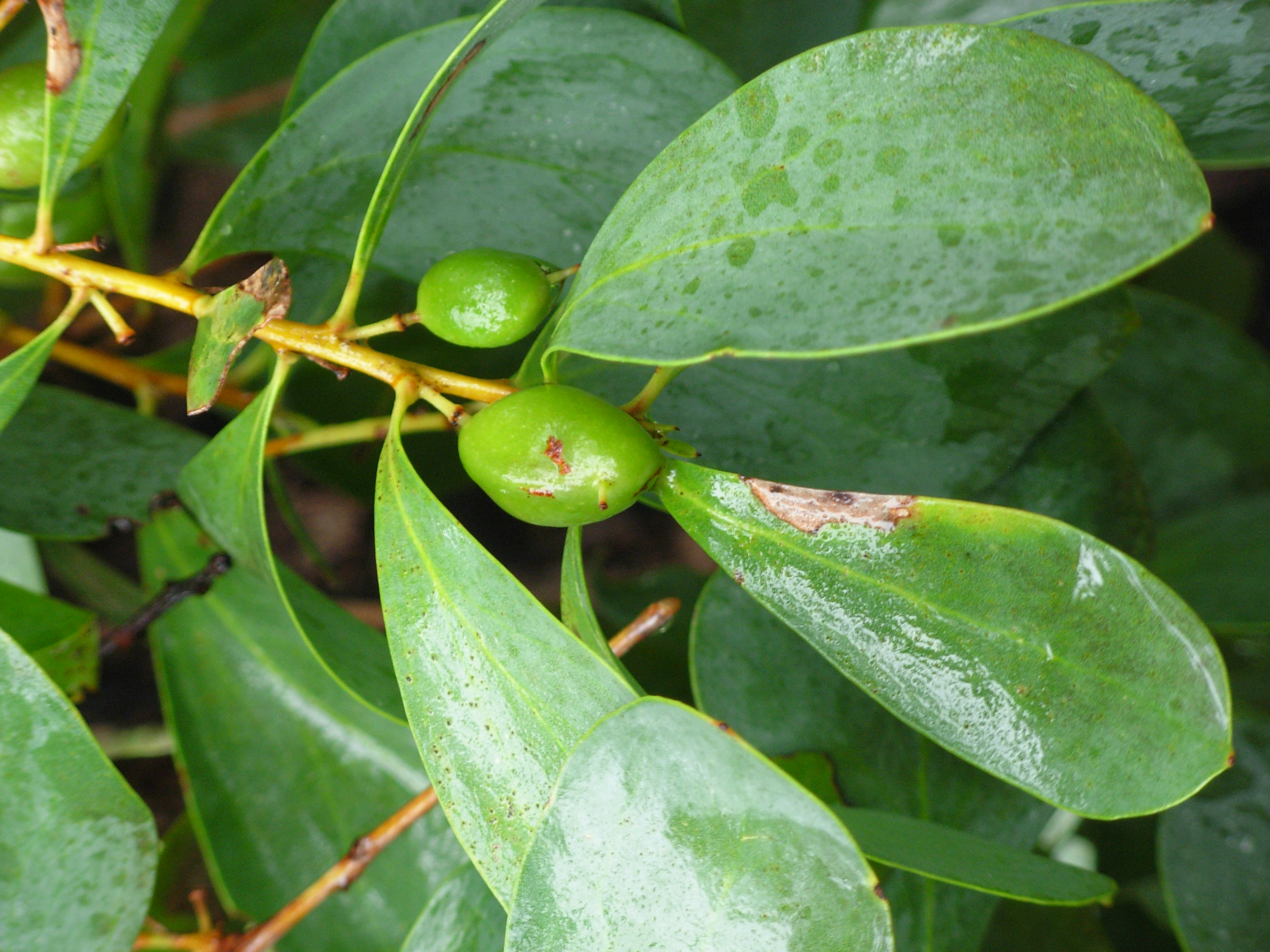
Leaves and fruit

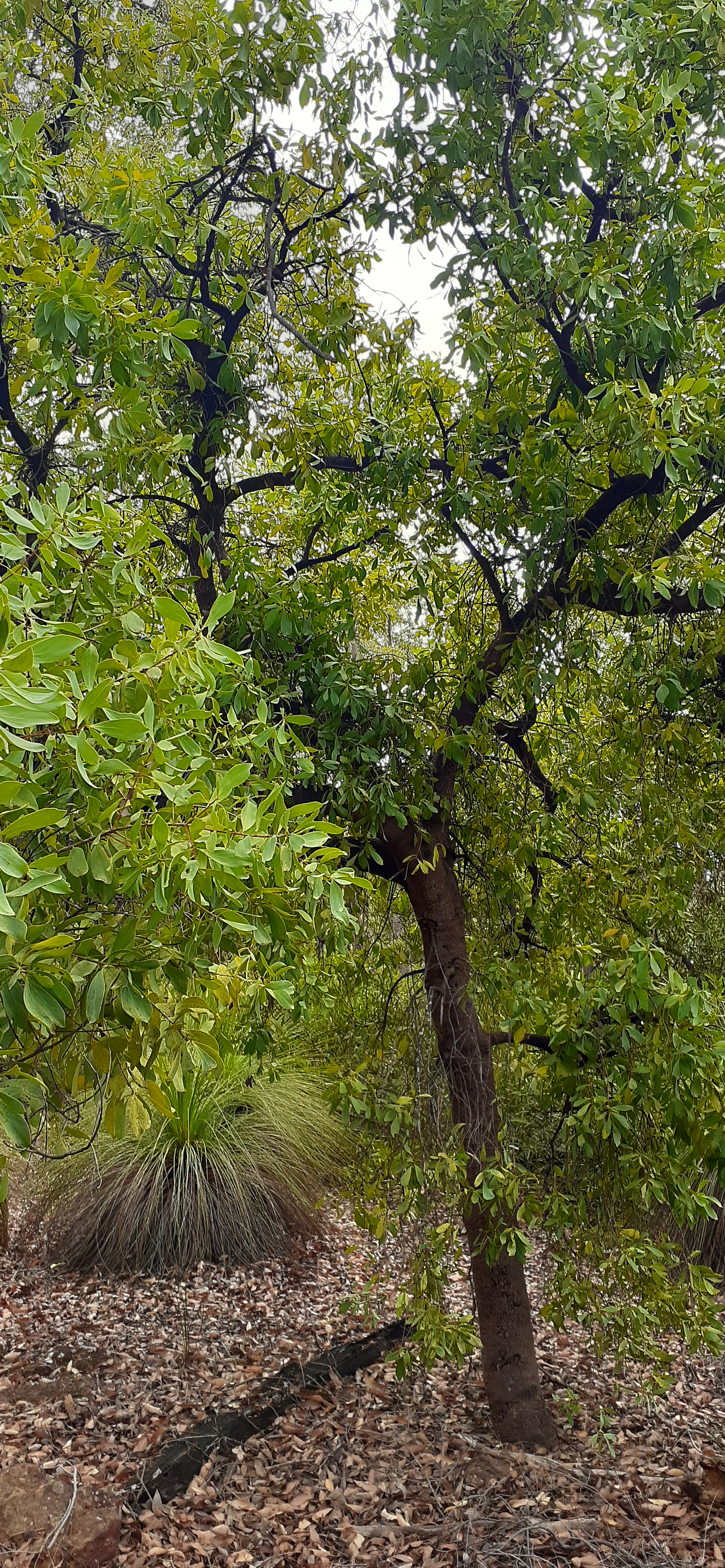
Habitat

Persoonia elliptica, commonly known as snottygobble or spreading snottygobble, is a plant in the family Proteaceae and is endemic to the south-west of Western Australia. It is an erect shrub or small tree with egg-shaped or lance-shaped leaves and groups of cylindrical yellow flowers. It usually grows in woodland or forest dominated by jarrah (Eucalyptus marginata) or marri (Corymbia calophylla) within 50 km (30 mi) of the coast.

== Description ==
Persoonia elliptica is an erect shrub or small, robust tree, usually with a single trunk growing to a height of 5–8 m (20–30 ft). The bark on the trunk is grey and corky. The leaves are arranged alternately and are lance-shaped to egg-shaped but with the narrower end towards the base, 50–110 mm (2–4 in) long, 9–50 mm (0.4–2 in) wide. The leaves are soft and flexible, a similar colour on both surfaces with a prominent midvein on the lower surface. The flowers are arranged in groups of between four and twenty five at the ends of the branches or in leaf axils. Each flower is on the end of a hairy pedicel 2.5–7 mm (0.1–0.3 in) long. The flower is composed of four glabrous or slightly hairy tepals 8–12.5 mm (0.3–0.5 in) long, which are fused at the base but with the tips rolled back. The central style is surrounded by four greenish-yellow anthers which are also joined at the base with the tips rolled back, so that it resembles a cross when viewed end-on. Flowering occurs from October to February and is followed by fruit which are smooth green drupes 8.5–13.5 mm (0.3–0.5 in) long and 5–7 mm (0.2–0.3 in) wide.

== Taxonomy and naming ==
Persoonia elliptica was first formally described in 1810 by Robert Brown from a specimen collected "on the side of a rocky hill near Lewin's Land" (Cape Leeuwin). The description was published in Transactions of the Linnean Society of London.

German botanist Otto Kuntze proposed the binomial name Linkia elliptica in 1891, from Cavanilles' original description of the genus Linkia but the name was eventually rejected in favour of Persoonia.

The genus was reviewed by Peter Weston for the Flora of Australia treatment in 1995, and P. elliptica was placed in the Longifolia group. However, Weston later placed it in the large Lanceolata group, a group of 54 closely related species with similar flowers but very different foliage, based on genetic evidence.

== Distribution and habitat ==
Snottygobble usually grows as an understorey shrub in forest dominated by jarrah or marri, often with Persoonia longifolia from which it is distinguished by its single trunk, large leaves with a narrow base and compact grey bark. It is found near the coast between Perth and Albany in the Esperance Plains, Jarrah Forest, Swan Coastal Plain and Warren biogeographic regions.

== Conservation ==
Persoonia elliptica is classified as "not threatened" by the Western Australian Government Department of Parks and Wildlife.
