= Catenospegazzinia elegans =

Scientific classification
- Kingdom: Fungi
- Division: Ascomycota
- Class: incertae sedis
- Genus: Catenospegazzinia
- Species: C. elegans

Binomial name
- Catenospegazzinia elegans Subramanian, 1991

Species of fungus

Catenospegazzinia elegans is a species of sac fungi. The holotype was found on dead inflorescence stalk of Xanthorrhoea preissii in Western Australia.
