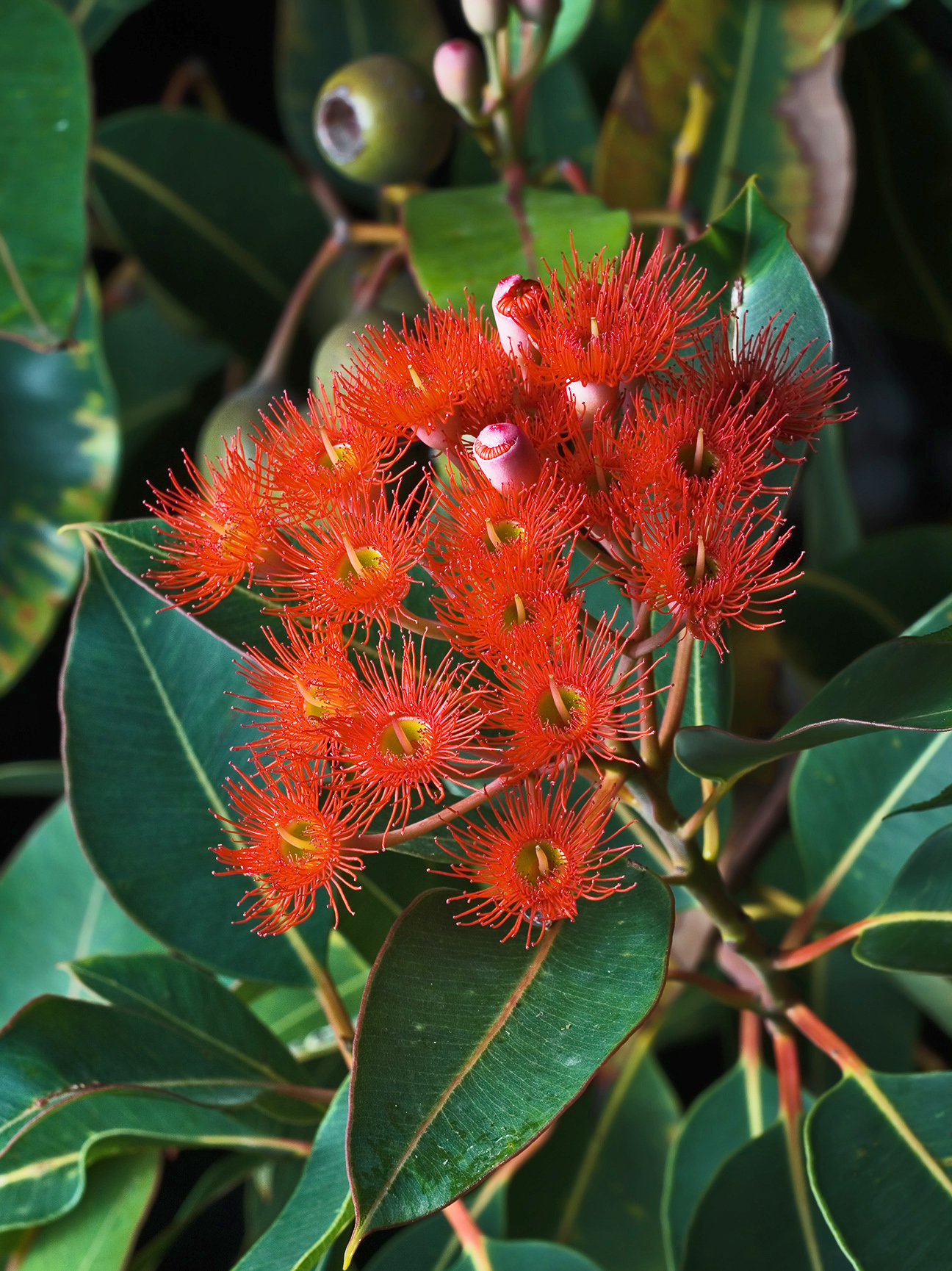

Conservation status
- Near Threatened (IUCN 3.1)

Scientific classification
- Kingdom: Plantae
- Clade: Tracheophytes
- Clade: Angiosperms
- Clade: Eudicots
- Clade: Rosids
- Order: Myrtales
- Family: Myrtaceae
- Genus: Corymbia
- Species: C. ficifolia

Binomial name
- Corymbia ficifolia (F.Muell.) K.D.Hill & L.A.S.Johnson

Synonyms
- Eucalyptus ficifolia F.Muell.; Eucalyptus ficifolia var. carmina Blakely

= Corymbia ficifolia =

Species of tree endemic to Western Australia

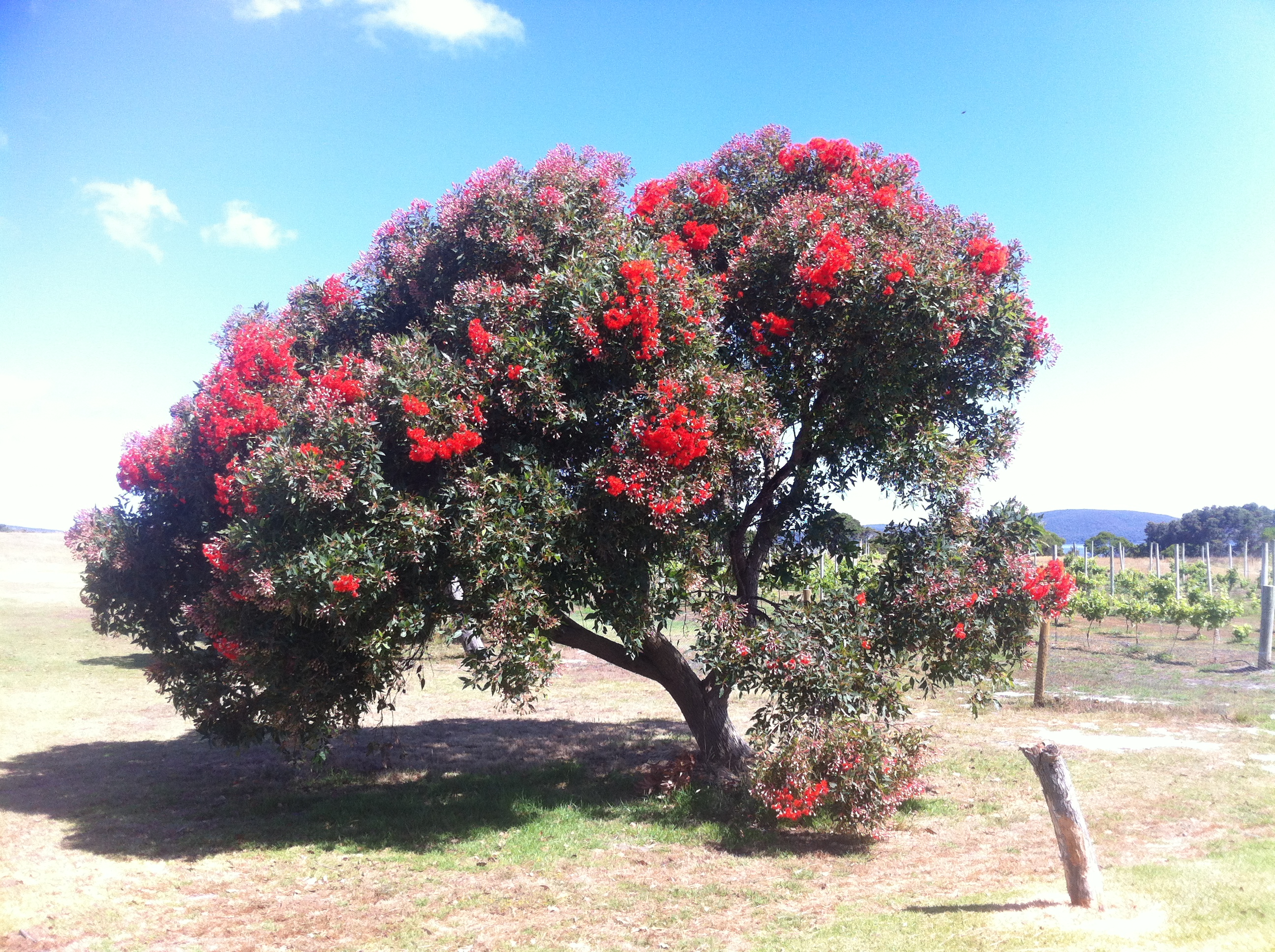

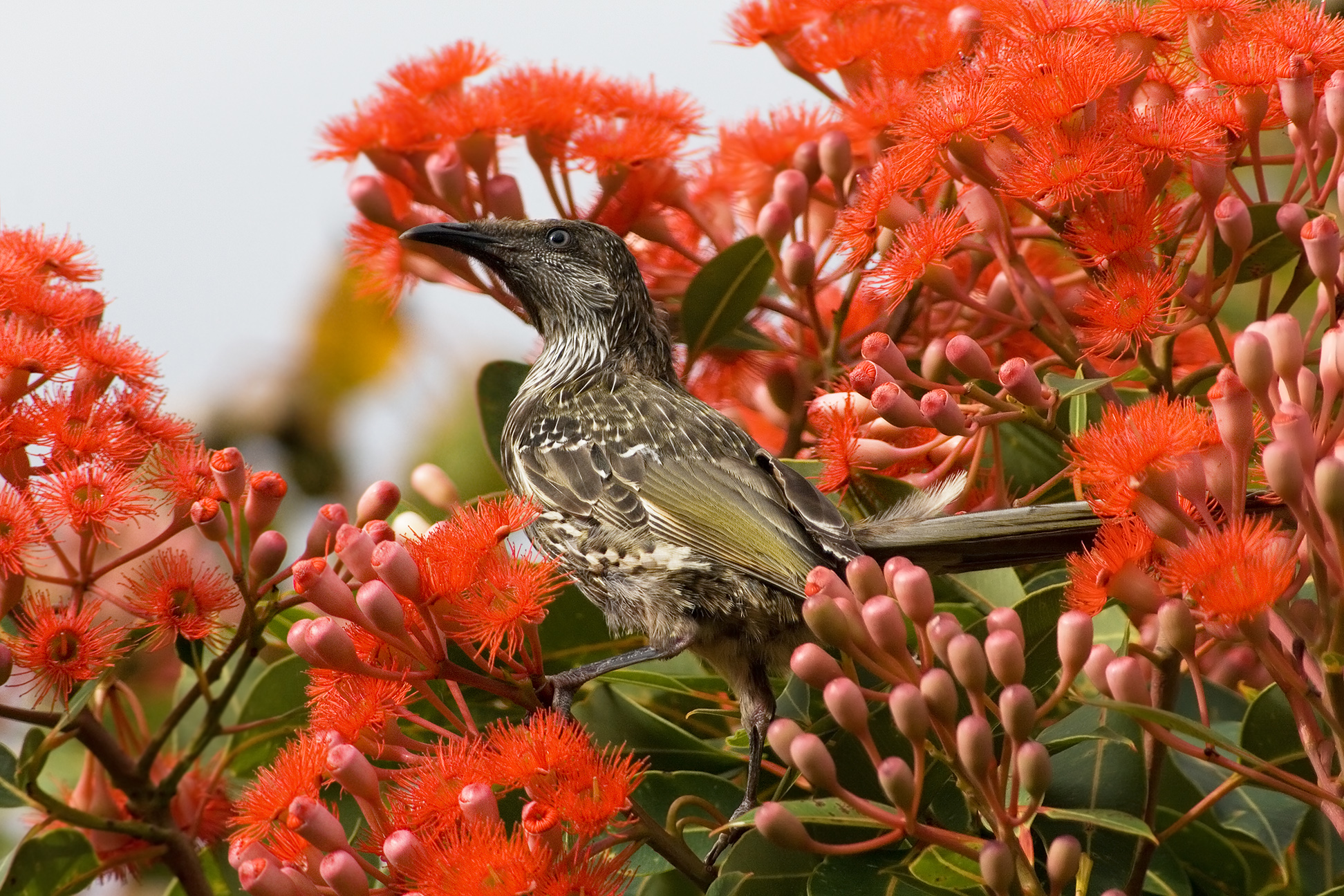
Little wattlebird feeding on a flowering specimen

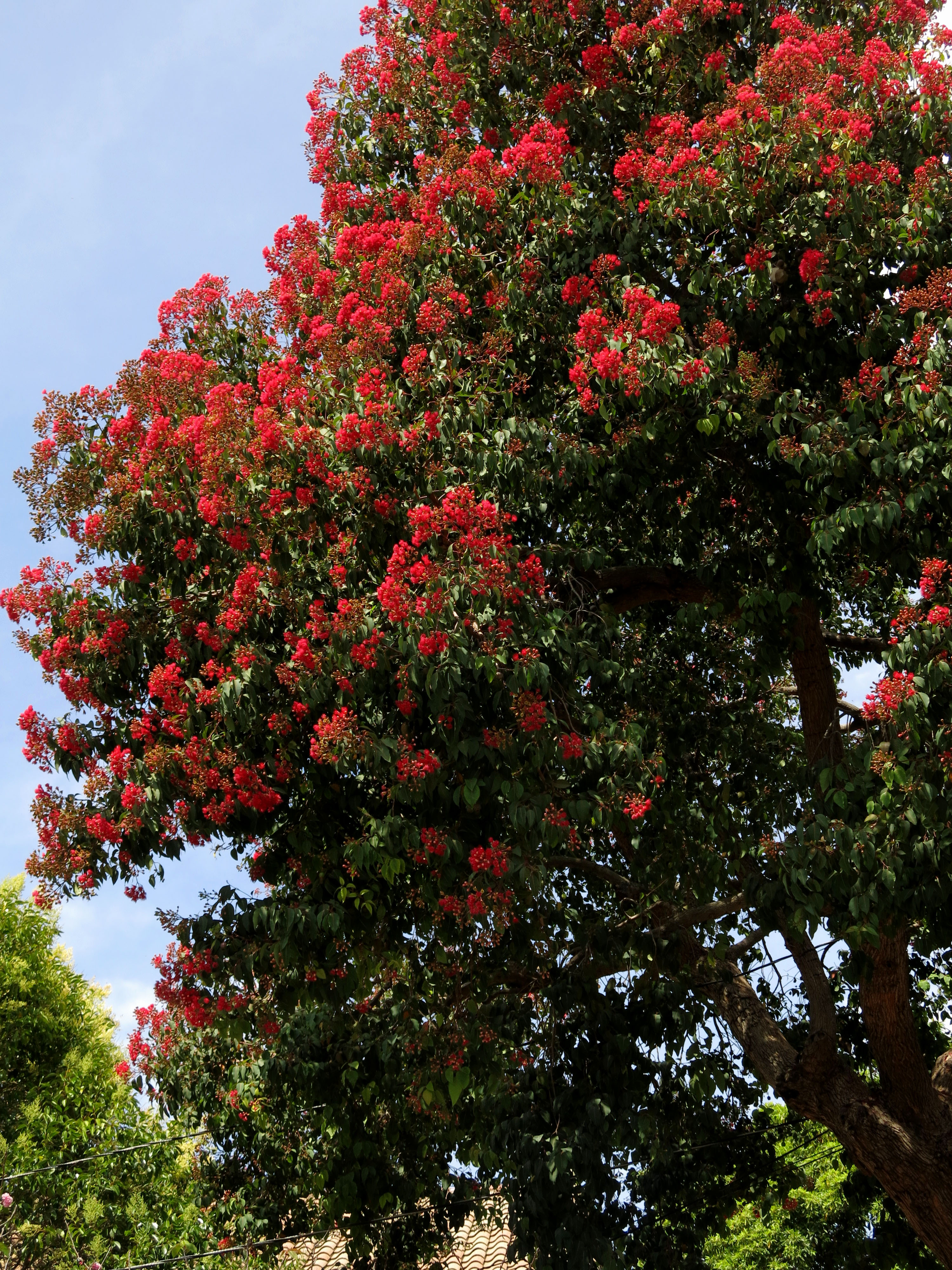

Corymbia ficifolia, commonly known as red flowering gum, is a species of small tree that is endemic to the south-west of Western Australia. It has rough, fibrous bark on the trunk and branches, egg-shaped to broadly lance-shape adult leaves, flower buds in groups of seven, bright red, pink or orange flowers and urn-shaped fruit. It has a restricted distribution in the wild but is one of the most commonly planted ornamental eucalypts.

== Description ==
Corymbia ficifolia is a straggly tree that typically grows to a height of 10 m (33 ft) and forms a lignotuber. It has rough, fibrous brownish bark on the trunk and branches. The adult leaves are dull to slightly glossy, paler on the lower surface, egg-shaped to broadly lance-shaped, 70–130 mm (2.8–5.1 in) long and 25–50 mm (1.0–2.0 in) wide, tapering to a petiole 8–20 mm (0.3–0.8 in) long. The flower buds are arranged on the ends of branchlets on a branched peduncle 15–32 mm (0.6–1.3 in) long, each branch of the peduncle with seven buds on pedicels 13–27 mm (0.5–1.1 in) long. Mature buds are oval to pear-shaped, 12–18 mm (0.5–0.7 in) long and 6–8 mm (0.24–0.31 in) wide with a rounded to flattened operculum. Flowering occurs from December to May and the flowers are bright red to pink to orange. The fruit is a woody urn-shaped capsule 20–42 mm (0.8–1.7 in) long and 18–30 mm (0.7–1.2 in) wide with the valves enclosed in the fruit.

The other two bloodwoods found in the south-west of Western Australia are C. haemotoxylon and marri (C. calophylla). Unlike C. ficifolia, they have tessellated bark rather than fibrous bark.

== Taxonomy ==
Red-flowering gum was first formally described in 1860 by Ferdinand von Mueller, who gave it the name Eucalyptus ficifolia and published the description in his book, Fragmenta Phytographiae Australiae. In 1995, Ken Hill and Lawrence Alexander Sidney Johnson changed the name to Corymbia ficifolia.

In 2009, Parra-O and colleagues published a combined analysis of nuclear rDNA (ETS + ITS) and morphological characters published to clarify relationships within the genus Corymbia. C. ficifolia was shown to comprise a natural group with two other Western Australian species C. calophylla and C. haematoxylon. They classified the group as section Calophyllae within the subgenus Corymbia.

The specific epithet ficifolia is from Latin ficus meaning 'fig' and folium 'leaf', referring to the similarity of its leaves to some species of Ficus.

The type specimen was collected from around the Broke Inlet by George Maxwell.

== Distribution and habitat ==
Corymbia ficifolia grows in sandy soil in low forest on slopes and is restricted to a sub-coastal distribution south-east of Perth, east of Mount Frankland, Walpole and the Stirling Range.

== Use in horticulture ==
Red-flowering gum is one of the most widely cultivated of all eucalypts, both in Australia and overseas. It is best suited to temperate districts with low summer rainfall and is rarely reliable on the east coast of Australia. In suitable climates it is moderately fast-growing and is often larger and more vigorous in cultivation than in the wild. Eucalypts are difficult to grow from cuttings and are usually grown from seed. As a result, flower colour cannot be guaranteed, although some small forms have become available as grafted plants.

In nature Corymbia ficifolia prefers infertile, sandy soils but it is readily adaptable to most temperate locations, provided it is not exposed to severe frost or sustained tropical damp. It is an ideal street tree as it is hardy, moderately fast growing, and rarely grows large enough to require pruning. The largest known single-stemmed tree of this species in the world (216.5 cm diameter) is located on Princes Street in Hamilton, New Zealand. Because of its big and lovely colourful flowers, genetic improvement for cold resistance in Dublin area in Ireland is being carried out by collecting seeds in the coldest parts of Western and Southern Australia where it grows. In Ireland most of the plants were killed by severe frosts but the surviving shoots have been kept by tissue culture.

== Gallery ==
Features of the red-flowering gum (Corymbia ficifolia)
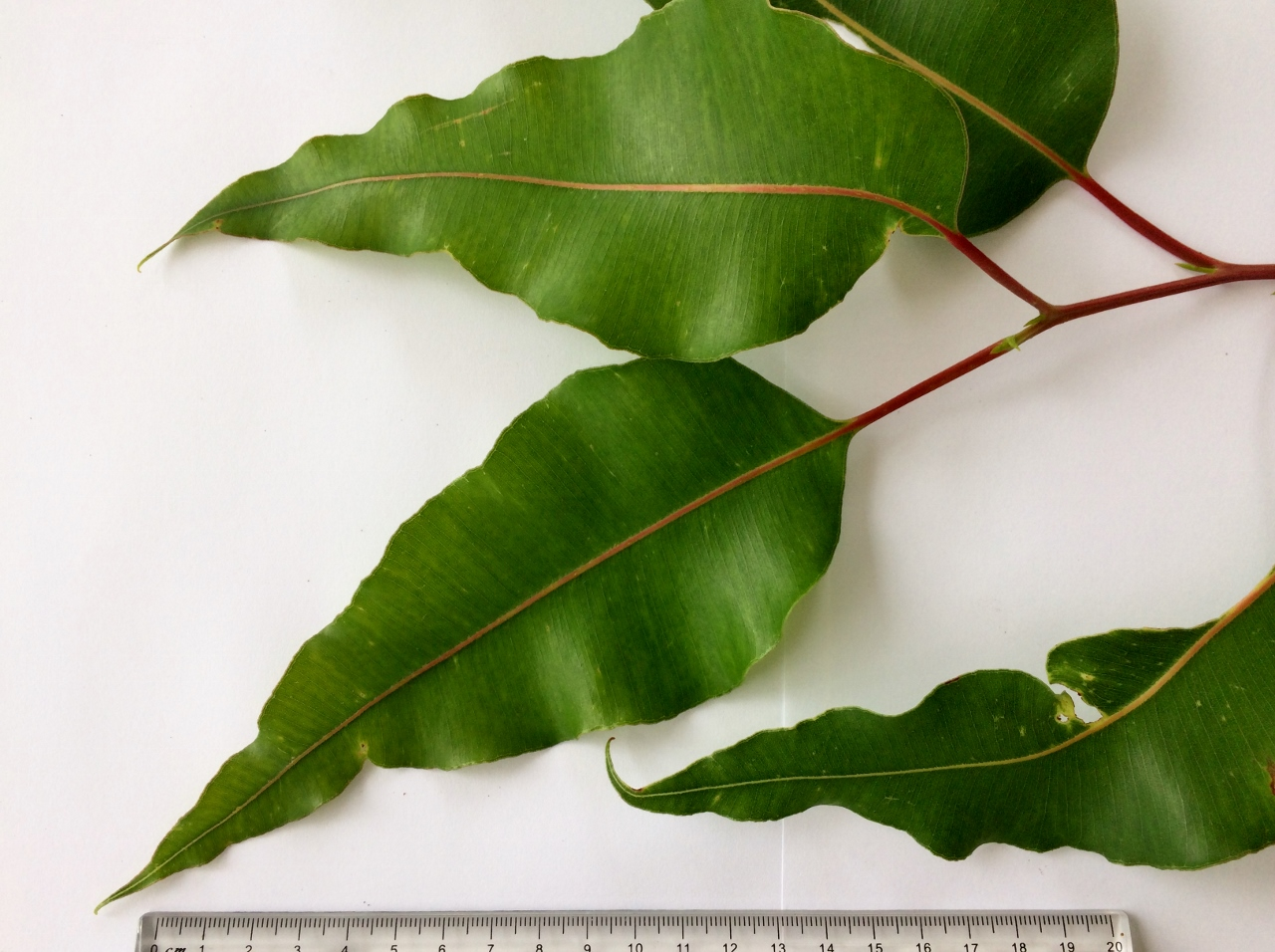
Adult leaves

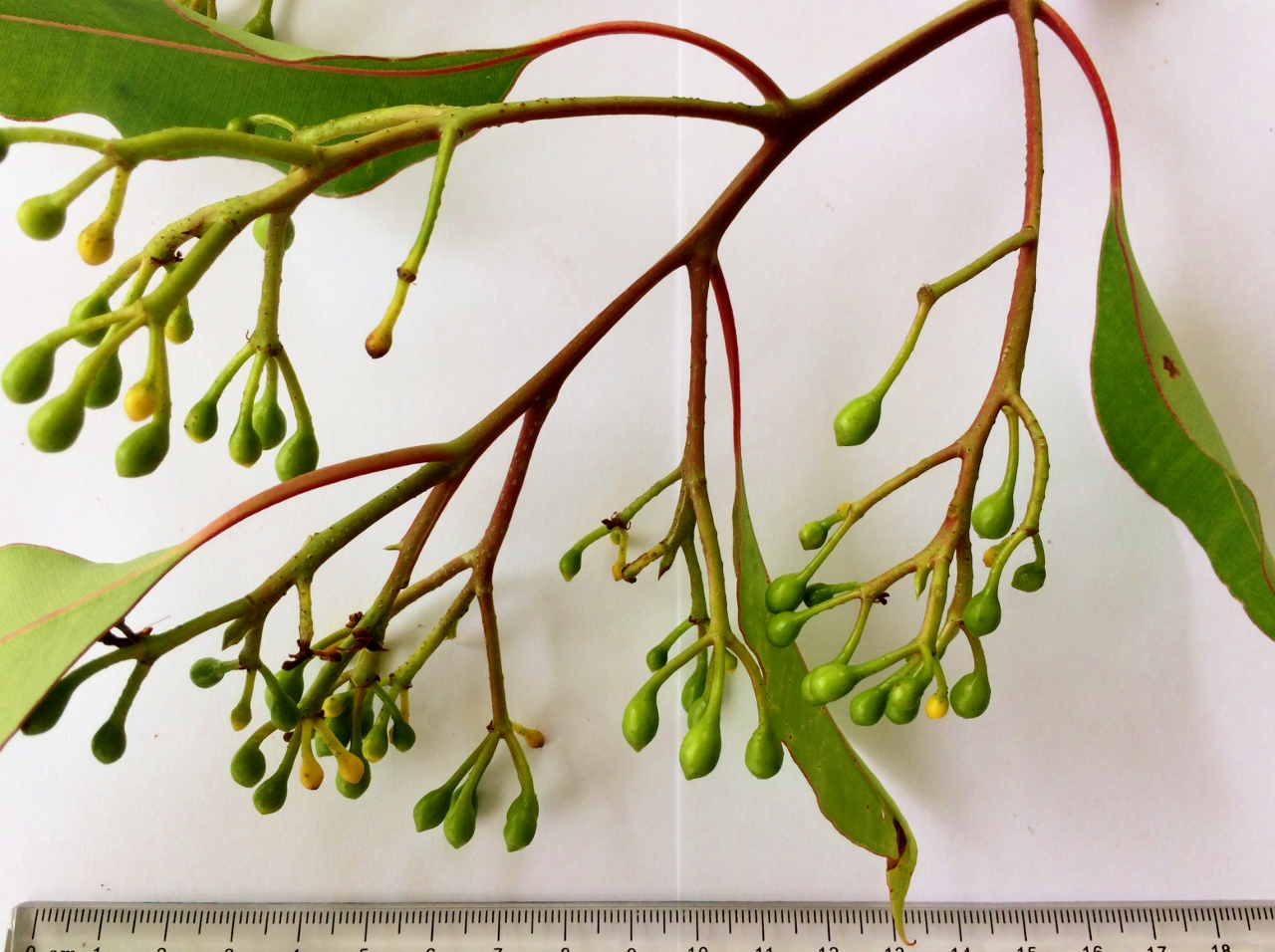
Buds

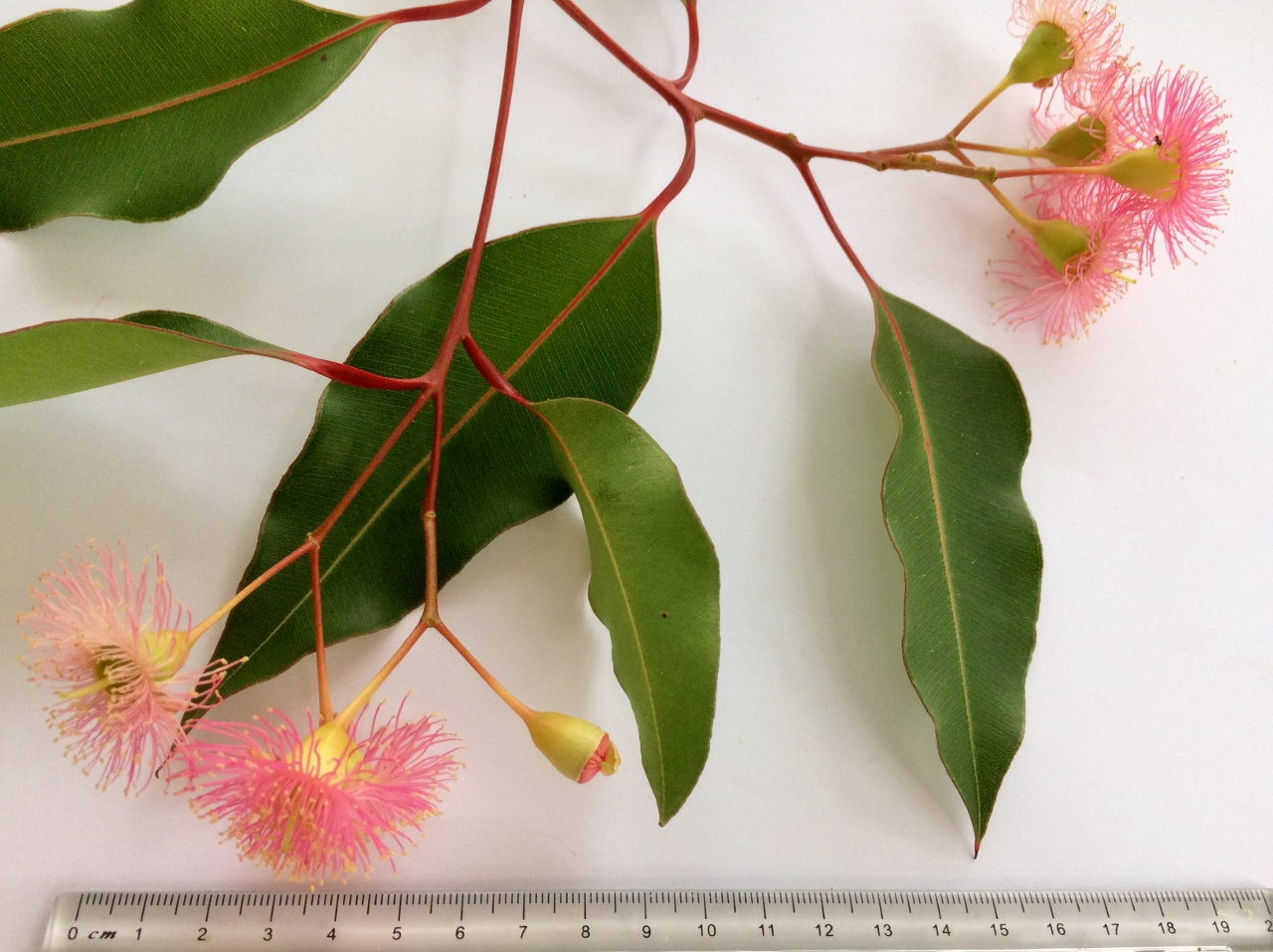
Inflorescence

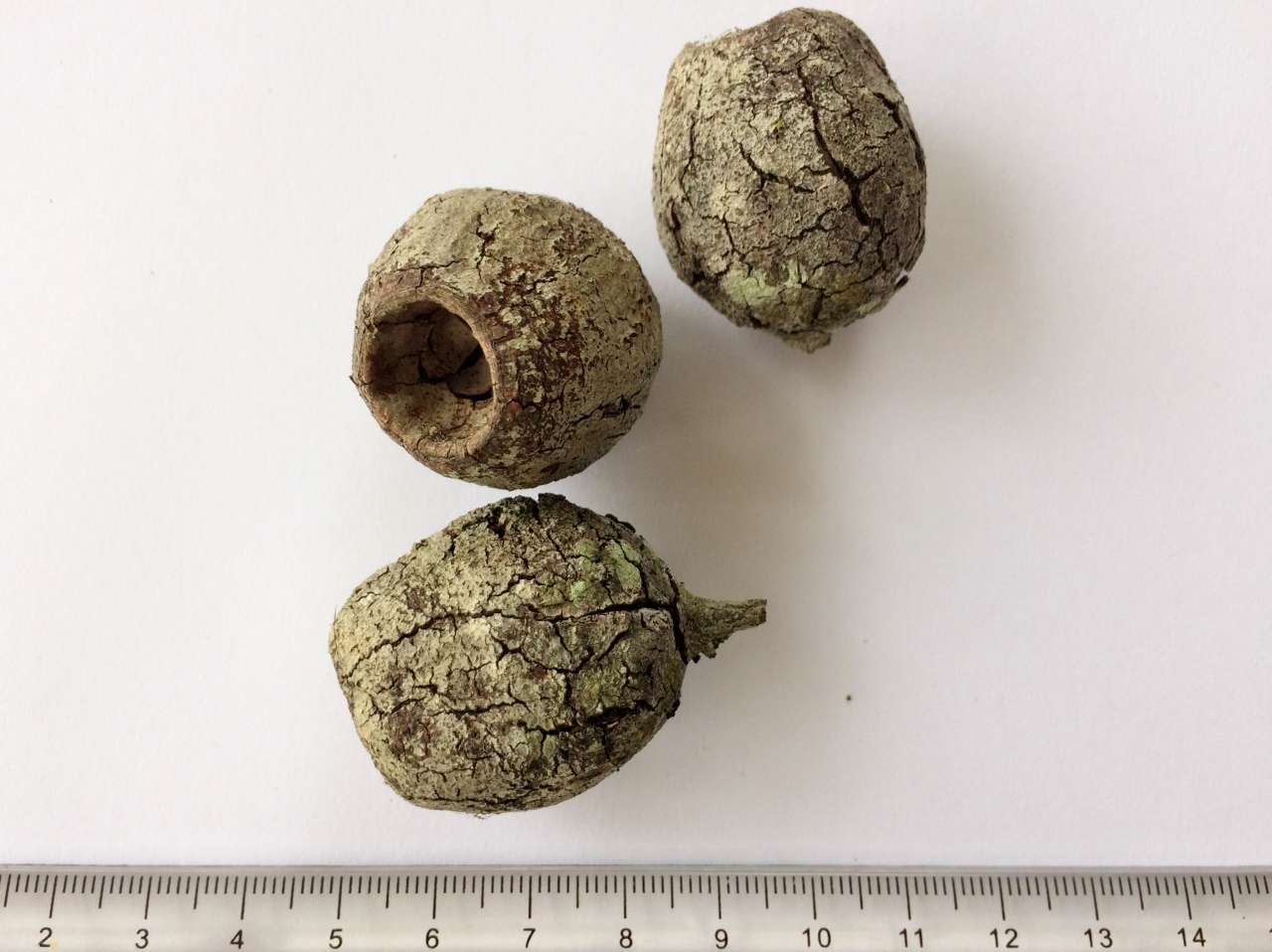
Fruit

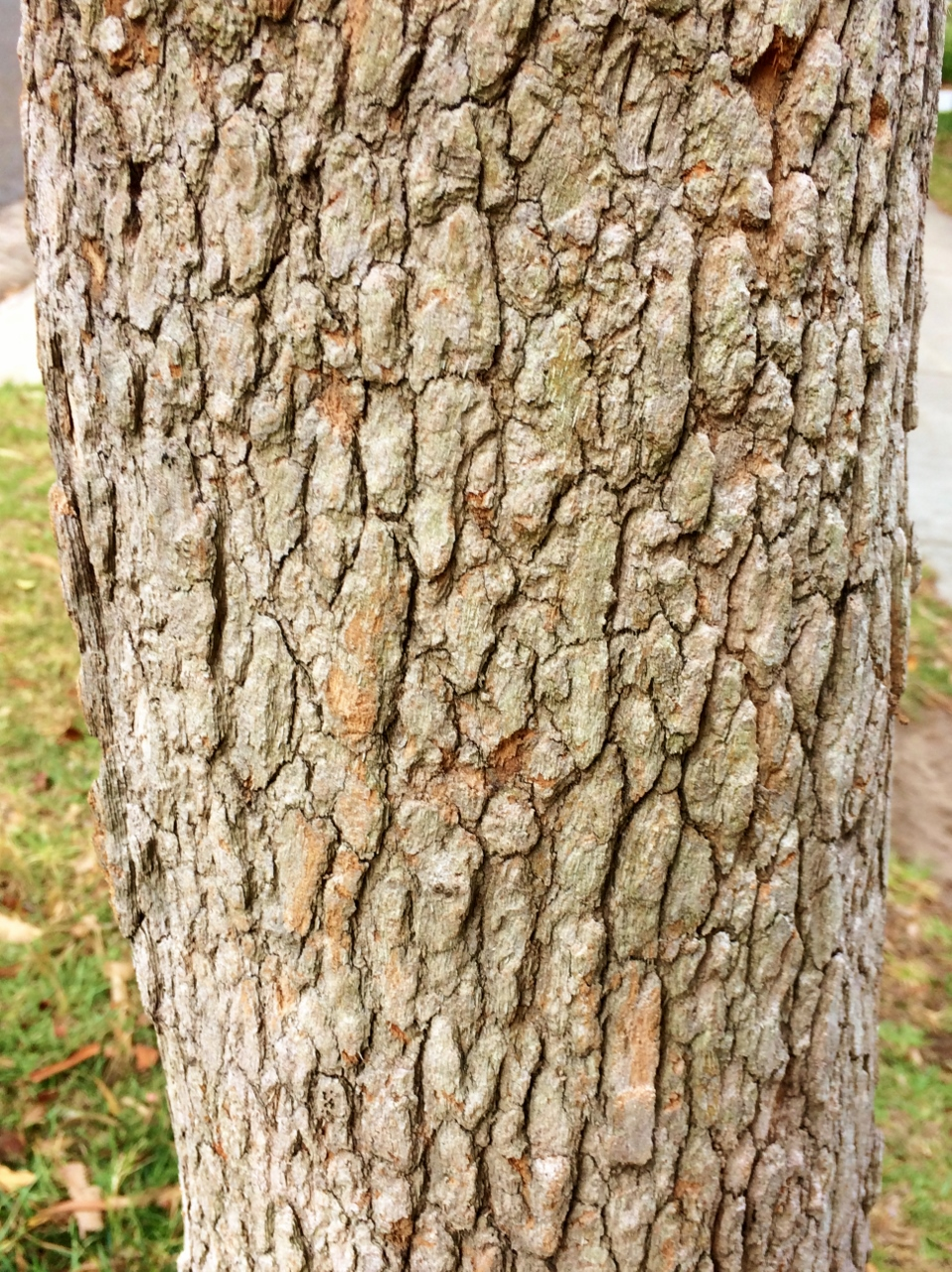
Trunk bark

== See also ==
- List of Corymbia species
