= Balga (disambiguation) =

Balga has several possible meanings, including:

- Balga, a ruined fortress and abandoned village in Russia
- Balga, a common name for the western Australian plant, Xanthorrhoea preissii
- Balga, Western Australia, a Perth suburb
- Electoral district of Balga, a former electorate of the Western Australian Legislative Assembly

== See also ==
- Khar Balgas, a Mongolian archaeological site
