= Corymbia calophylla – Xanthorrhoea preissii woodlands and shrublands of the Swan Coastal Plain =

Ecological community in Australia

Corymbia calophylla – Xanthorrhoea preissii woodlands and shrublands of the Swan Coastal Plain is an ecological community in the Southwest Australia ecoregion.

The assemblage, found inland on the eastern side of the Swan Coastal Plain, is defined by the presence of plant species at drier or lower rainfall areas of heavy soils dominated by several marri communities. The mid and upper story vegetation is the marri tree, Corymbia calophylla, and the grasstree Xanthorrhoea preissii, called balga.

Marri is also found in two other described ecological communities which contain some plants of the assemblage, those in wetter areas of the range with a greater diversity of plants. The locations of these communities is a remnant of a previously greater range, having been reduced by possibly over 97%. The community is recognised by an association of species: trees are Corymbia calophylla and occasional Eucalyptus wandoo; shrubs are Acacia pulchella, Dryandra nivea (Banksia nivea), Gompholobium marginatum, Hypocalymma angustifolia and Xanthorrhoea preissii; the herbaceous plants are Burchardia umbellata, Cyathochaeta avenacea and Neurachne alopecuroidea.

Threatened species are associated with this community, itself listed as endangered; the western swamp tortoise (Pseudemydura umbrina), critically endangered, occurs in and near the community, as do the rare plants Isopogon drummondii and fringed lily Thysanotus glaucus.
