= Catenospegazzinia =

Scientific classification
- Kingdom: Fungi
- Division: Ascomycota
- Class: incertae sedis
- Genus: Catenospegazzinia; Subramanian, 1991

Species
- Catenospegazzinia elegans Subram., 1991; Catenospegazzinia pulchra Subram., 1991

Genus of fungi

Catenospegazzinia is a genus of sac fungi.
