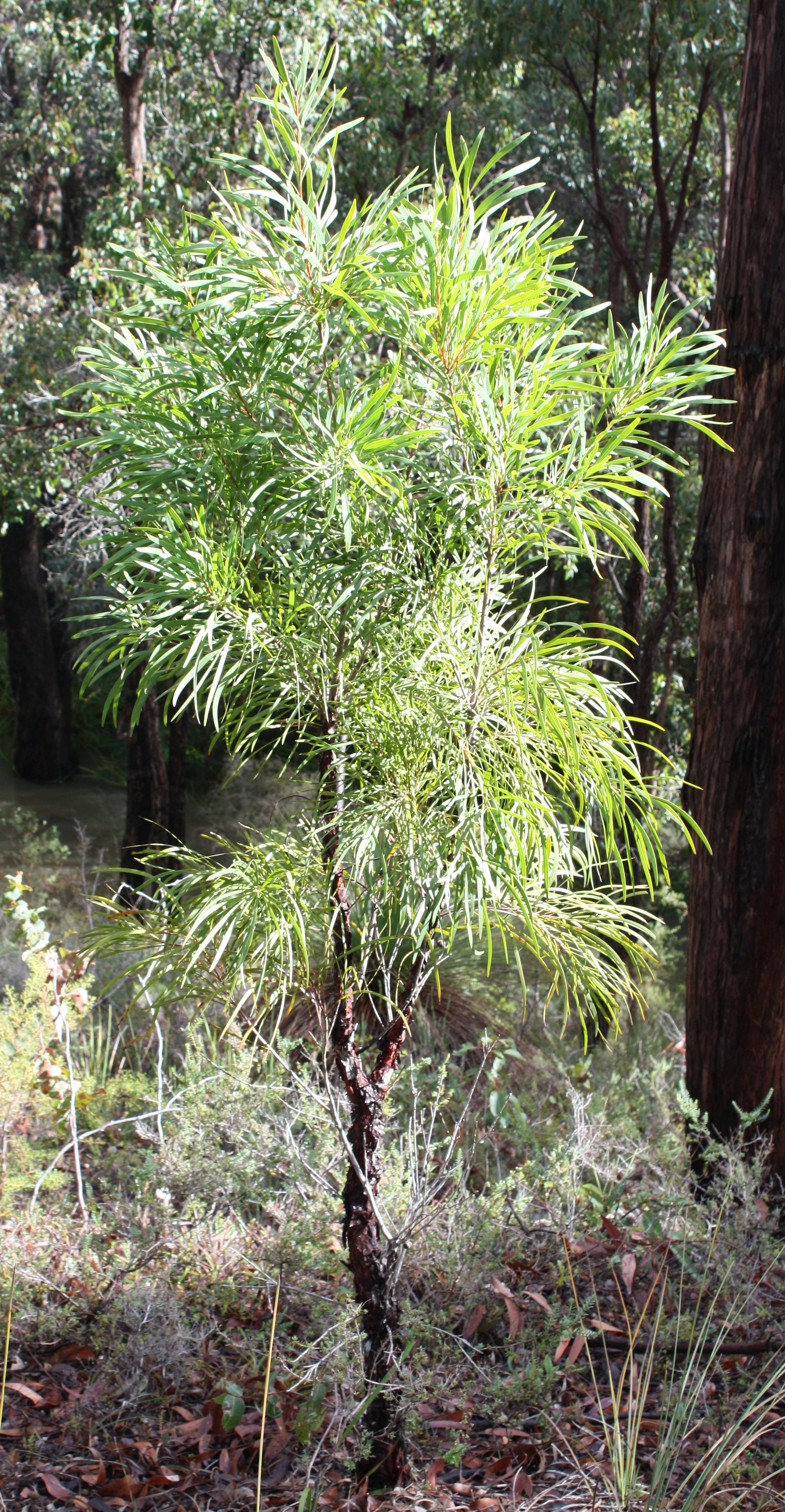
- Near Nannup

Scientific classification
- Kingdom: Plantae
- Clade: Tracheophytes
- Clade: Angiosperms
- Clade: Eudicots
- Order: Proteales
- Family: Proteaceae
- Genus: Persoonia
- Species: P. longifolia

Binomial name
- Persoonia longifolia R.Br.

Synonyms
- Linkia articulata (R.Br.) Kuntze; Linkia longifolia (R.Br.) Kuntze; Persoonia articulata R.Br.; Persoonia drummondii Lindl.

= Persoonia longifolia =

Snottygobble

Species of flowering plant

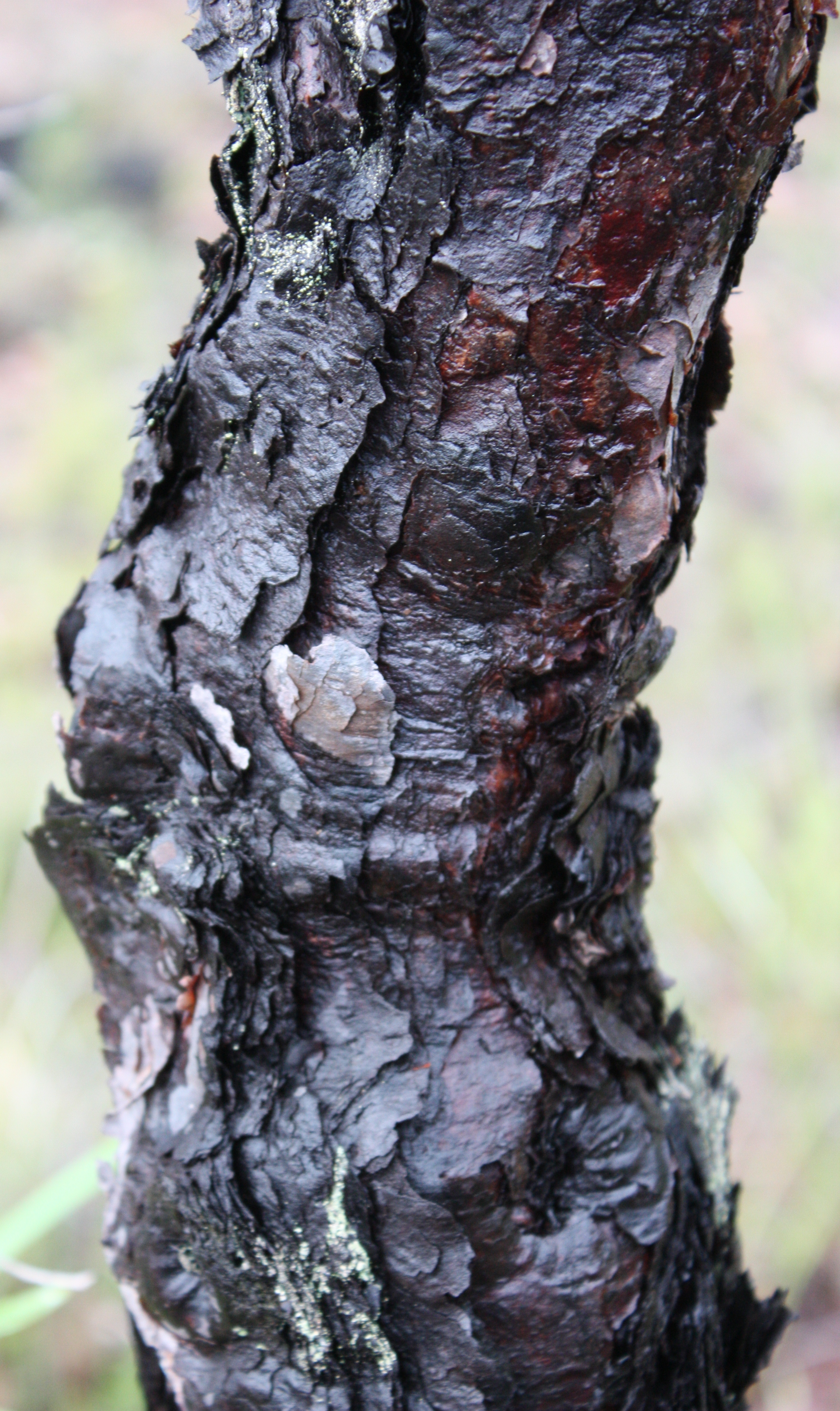
Bark

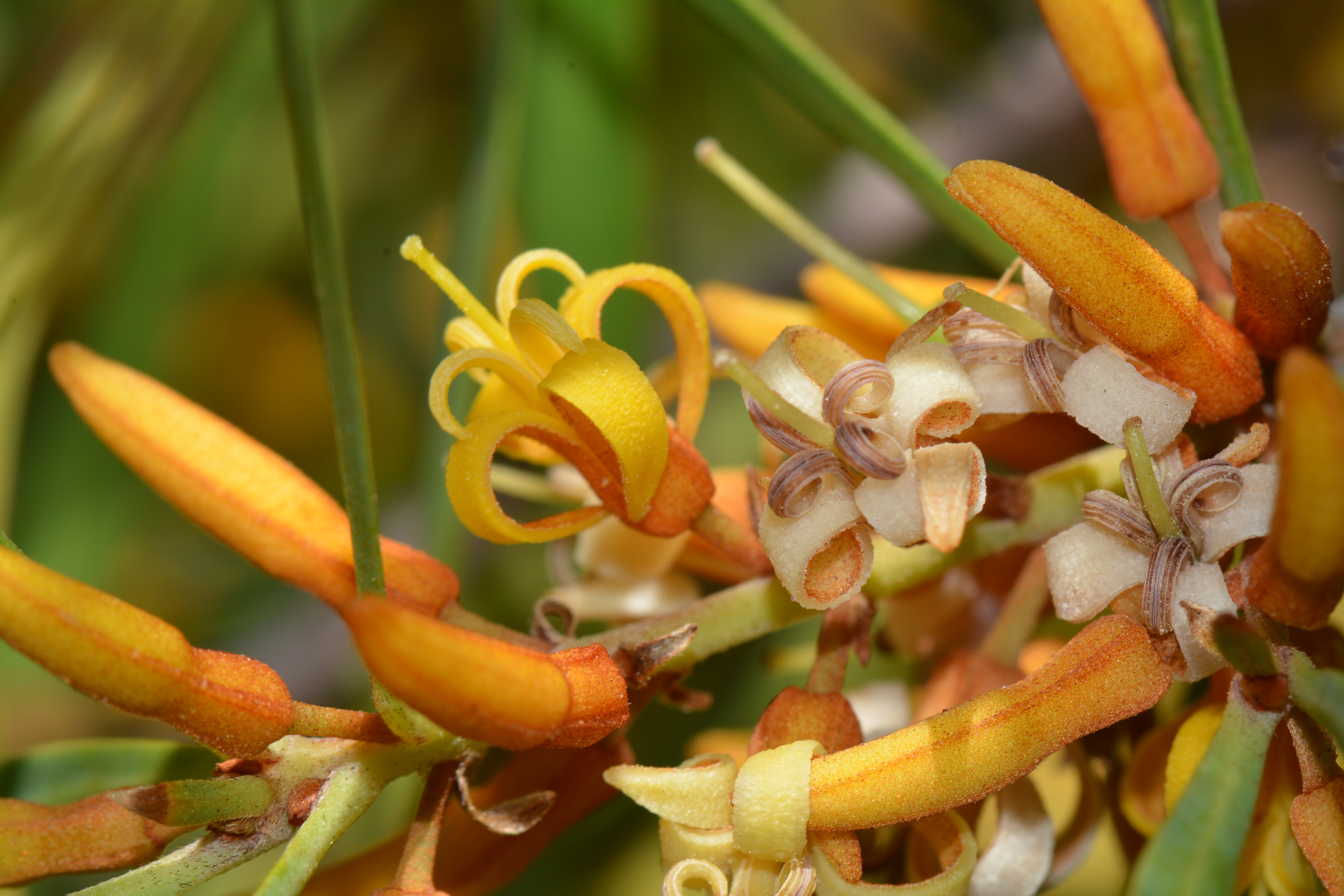
Flowers

Persoonia longifolia, commonly known as snottygobble, is a species of flowering plant in the family Proteaceae and is endemic to the southwest of Western Australia. It is a shrub or small tree characterised by its weeping foliage, yellow flowers and distinctive flaky bark.

== Description ==
Persoonia longifolia is an erect shrub or small tree that typically grows to a height of 1–5 m (3 ft 3 in – 16 ft 5 in), usually with a single main trunk. It has flaky-papery bark, brown or greyish on the surface and reddish purple below. Young branchlets are covered with brown to rust-coloured hairs. The leaves are linear to lance-shaped with the narrower end towards the base, 80–200 mm (3.1–7.9 in) long and 2–16 mm (0.079–0.630 in) wide. The flowers are borne in groups of up to thirty on stalks up to 70 mm (2.8 in) long near the ends of branches, each flower on a pedicel 4–12 mm (0.16–0.47 in) long, the tepals yellow and 10–16 mm (0.39–0.63 in) long. Flowering occurs from October to January and the fruit is a smooth drupe 7.5–10 mm (0.30–0.39 in) long and 6–7.5 mm (0.24–0.30 in) wide maturing from July and containing a single seed.

== Taxonomy and naming ==
Persoonia longifolia was first collected described in 1810 by Robert Brown Transactions of the Linnean Society of London. The species name derives from the Latin terms longus "long", and folium "leaf". Within the genus Persoonia, it is classified in the Lanceolata group, a group of 54 closely related species with similar flowers but very different foliage. These species will often interbreed with each other where two members of the group occur.

== Distribution and habitat ==
Snottygobble is found in the southwest of Western Australia within 70 km (43 mi) of the coast between Albany and the southeastern edges of Perth. It occurs in the jarrah, karri, marri and tingle forest.

== Ecology ==
Persoonia longifolia resprouts from both epicormic buds and from the lignotuber after a fire, often several months later.

A study of the phenology of this species has concluded that it grows, flowers and sets fruit in summer. Young branches are often damaged by larvae of the tip-boring Ptyssoptera moth and by birds including the red-tailed black cockatoo (Calyptorhynchus banksii) and Australian ringneck parrot (Barnardius zonarius). Flowering commences in October and is completed by January, with peak flowering in November and December. The only pollinators observed during the study were native bees and the introduced honey-bee (Apis mellifera).

Mature fruit falls from late July to September and are often eaten by wallabies, kangaroos and the bobtail skink (Tiliqua rugosa). If left untouched by animals, the fleshy part of the fruit either rots or shrivels and dries. Germination occurs in late winter to early spring from fruits produced in the previous season but microclimate appears to be an important factor in germination rate. Even when germination occurs, few survive with most seedlings succumbing to desiccation or grazing.

== Conservation status ==
This persoonia is classified as "not threatened" by the Western Australian Government Department of Parks and Wildlife.

== Uses ==
In addition to being used for minesite restoration, P. longifolia is used in the cut-flower trade, being valued for its weeping appearance and durability. It also has potential in the nursery trade for its symmetrical habit, weeping foliage and textured, flaky bark, but studies have suggested that at least eighteen months of soil burial is required for seed germination.
