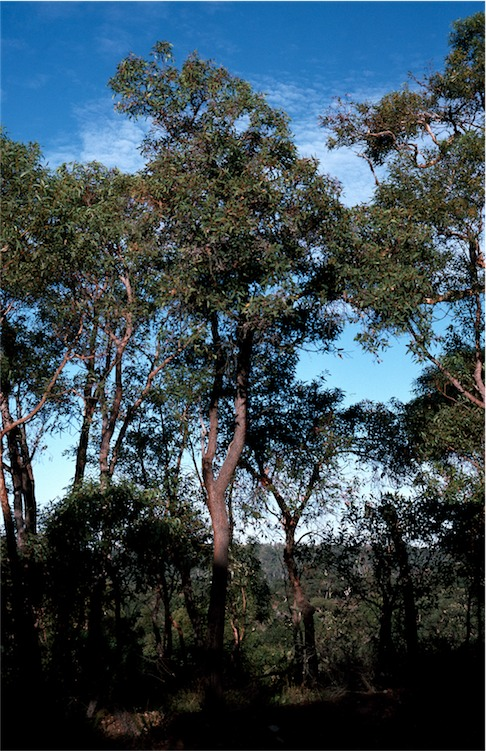

Scientific classification
- Kingdom: Plantae
- Clade: Tracheophytes
- Clade: Angiosperms
- Clade: Eudicots
- Clade: Rosids
- Order: Myrtales
- Family: Myrtaceae
- Genus: Corymbia
- Species: C. haematoxylon

Binomial name
- Corymbia haematoxylon (Maiden) K.D.Hill & L.A.S.Johnson

Synonyms
- Eucalyptus haematoxylon Maiden; Corymbia chlorolampra K.D.Hill & L.A.S.Johnson

= Corymbia haematoxylon =

Mountain marri

Species of plant

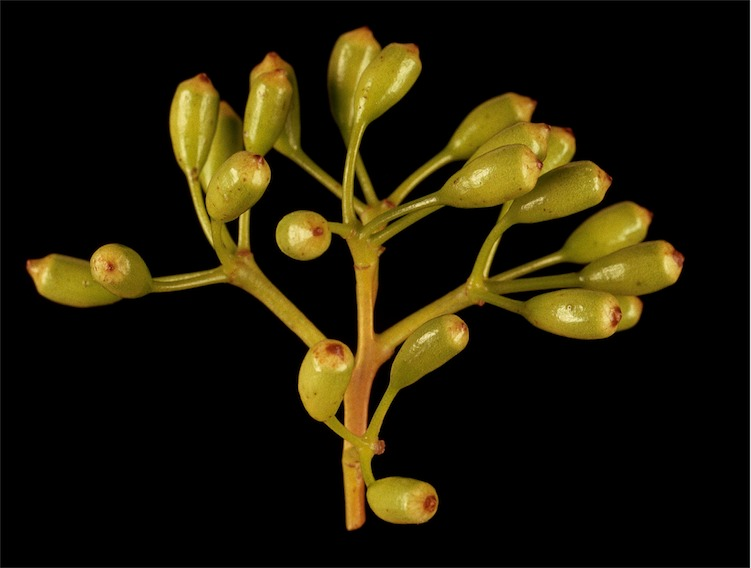
flower buds

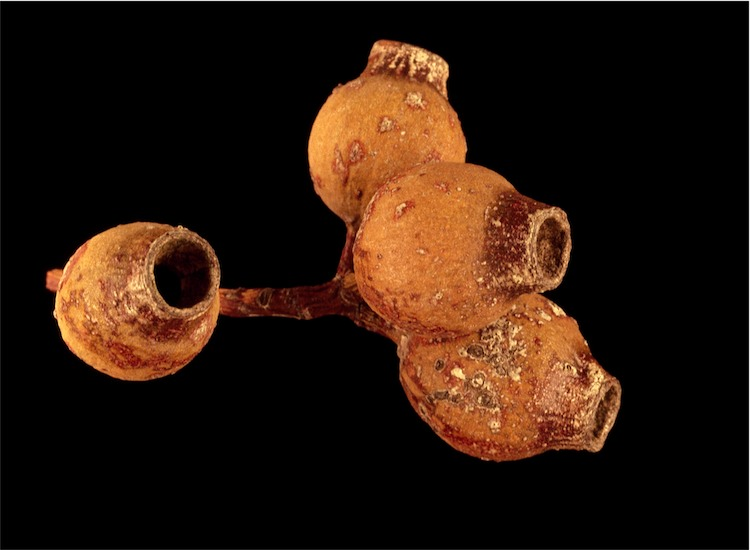
fruit

Corymbia haematoxylon, commonly known as mountain marri, is a species of tree that is endemic to the south-west of Western Australia. It has rough, tessellated bark on the trunk and branches, lance-shaped to narrow egg-shaped adult leaves, flower buds in groups of seven, white flowers and urn-shaped fruit.

== Description ==
Corymbia haematoxylon is a tree that typically grows to a height of 15 m (49 ft) and forms a lignotuber. It has rough, tessellated, brownish bark on the trunk and branches. Young plants and coppice regrowth have egg-shaped to broadly lance-shaped, petiolate leaves. Adult leaves are arranged alternately, paler on the lower surface, lance-shaped to narrow egg-shaped, 70–120 mm (2.8–4.7 in) long and 20–35 mm (0.79–1.38 in) wide, tapering to a petiole 12–25 mm (0.47–0.98 in) long. The flower buds are arranged on the ends of branchlets on a branched peduncle 12–20 mm (0.47–0.79 in) long, each branch of the peduncle with seven buds on pedicels 4–13 mm (0.16–0.51 in) long. Mature buds are oblong to oval, 6–11 mm (0.24–0.43 in) long and 4–7 mm (0.16–0.28 in) wide with a flattened operculum. Flowering occurs from October or December to January or March and the flowers are white. The fruit is a woody urn-shaped capsule 15–36 mm (0.59–1.42 in) long and 12–27 mm (0.47–1.06 in) wide with the valves enclosed in the fruit.

== Taxonomy and naming ==
Mountain marri was first formally described in 1914 by Joseph Maiden who gave it the name Eucalyptus haematoxylon and published the description in Journal and Proceedings of the Royal Society of New South Wales. In 1995 by Ken Hill and Lawrie Johnson changed the name to Corymbia haematoxylon.

== Distribution and habitat ==
Corymbia haematoxylon grows in open forest on flats and slopes in sandy soil over sandstone or laterite. It occurs in scattered populations on the western Darling Range between Byford and Capel with a disjunct population near Mount Lesueur. The tree is associated with marri (Corymbia calophylla) woodland and resembles a miniature version of that species.
