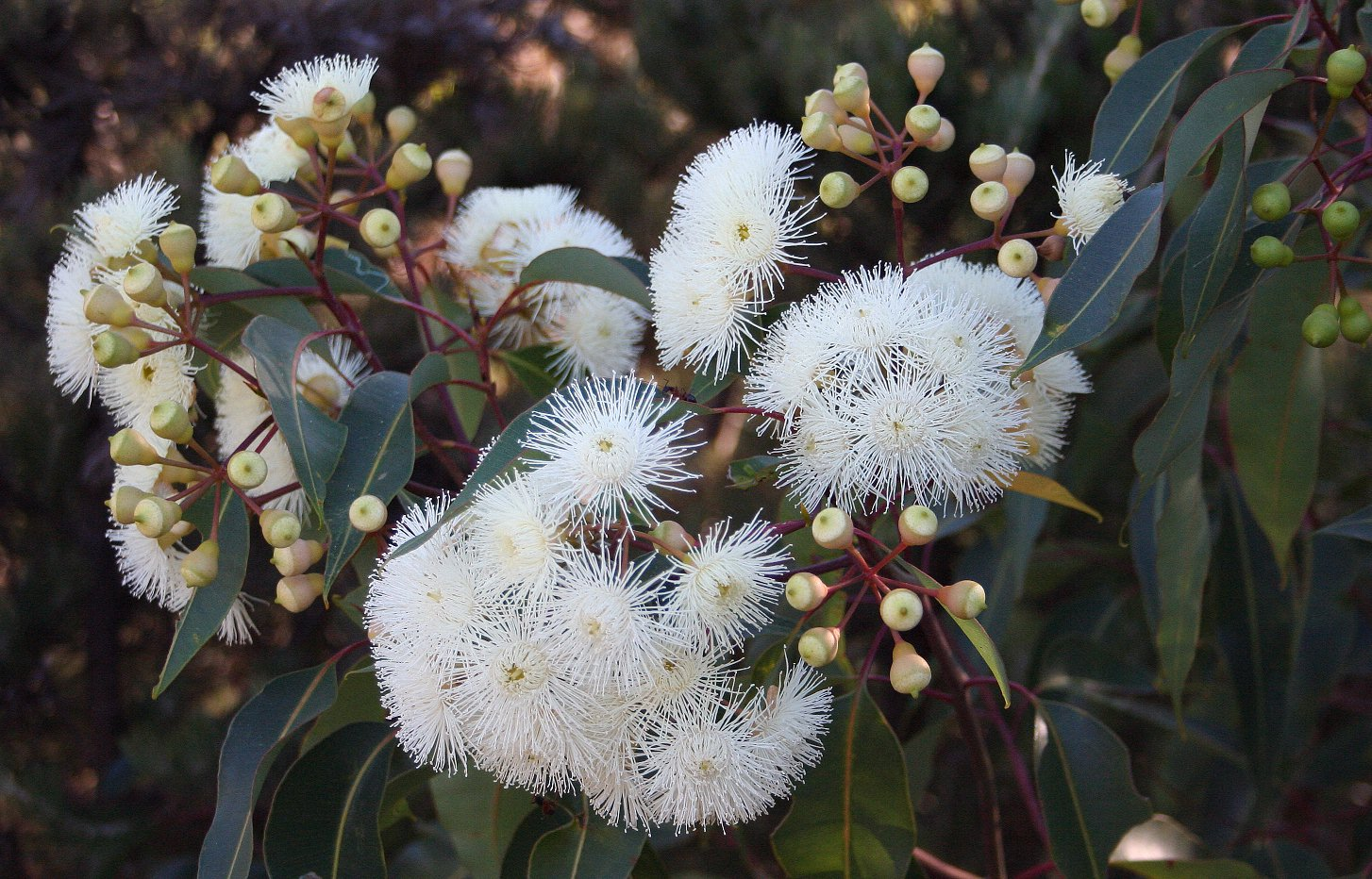
- Near Cataby

Conservation status
- Near Threatened (IUCN 3.1)

Scientific classification
- Kingdom: Plantae
- Clade: Tracheophytes
- Clade: Angiosperms
- Clade: Eudicots
- Clade: Rosids
- Order: Myrtales
- Family: Myrtaceae
- Genus: Corymbia
- Species: C. calophylla

Binomial name
- Corymbia calophylla (Lindl.) K.D.Hill & L.A.S.Johnson

Synonyms
- synonyms: Eucalyptus calophylla R.Br. nom. inval., nom. nud.; Eucalyptus calophylla Lindl.; Eucalyptus calophylla Lindl. var. calophylla; Eucalyptus calophylla var. maideniana Hochr.; Eucalyptus calophylla var. parviflora Blakely; Eucalyptus calophylla var. typica Hochr. nom. inval.; Eucalyptus ficifolia var. alba Blakely nom. illeg.; ? Eucalyptus glaucophylla Hoffmanns.; Eucalyptus splachnicarpa Hook.; Eucalyptus splachnicarpon Hook. orth. var.

= Corymbia calophylla =

Marri

Tree found in Western Australia

Corymbia calophylla, commonly known as marri, is a species of flowering plant in the family Myrtaceae and is endemic to the southwest of Western Australia. It is a tree or mallee with rough bark on part or all of the trunk, lance-shaped adult leaves, branched clusters of cup-shaped or pear-shaped flower buds, each branch with three or seven buds, white to pink flowers, and relatively large oval to urn-shaped fruit, colloquially known as honky nuts. Marri wood has had many uses, both for Aboriginal people, and in the construction industry.

== Description ==
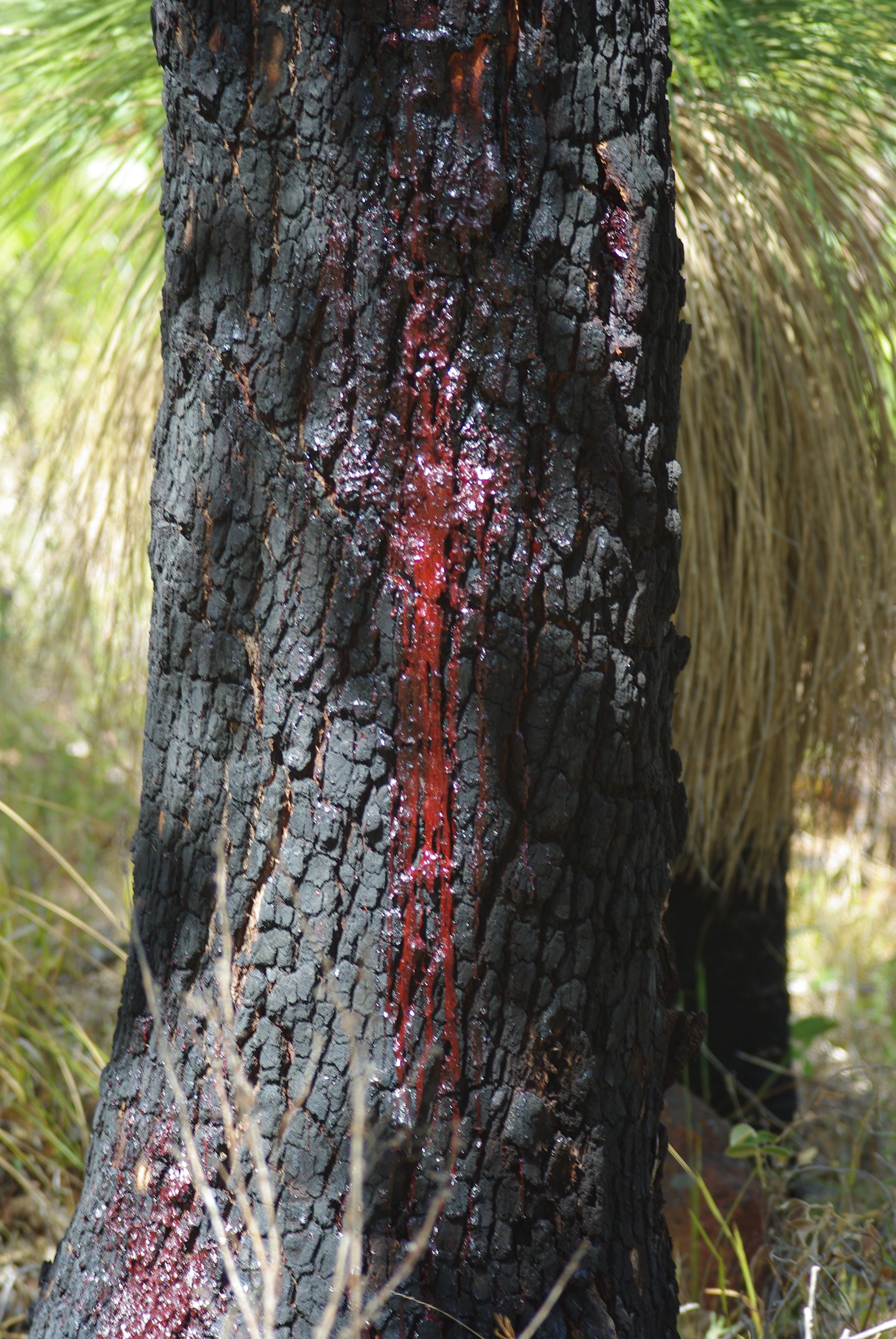
Red kino on fire damaged trunk

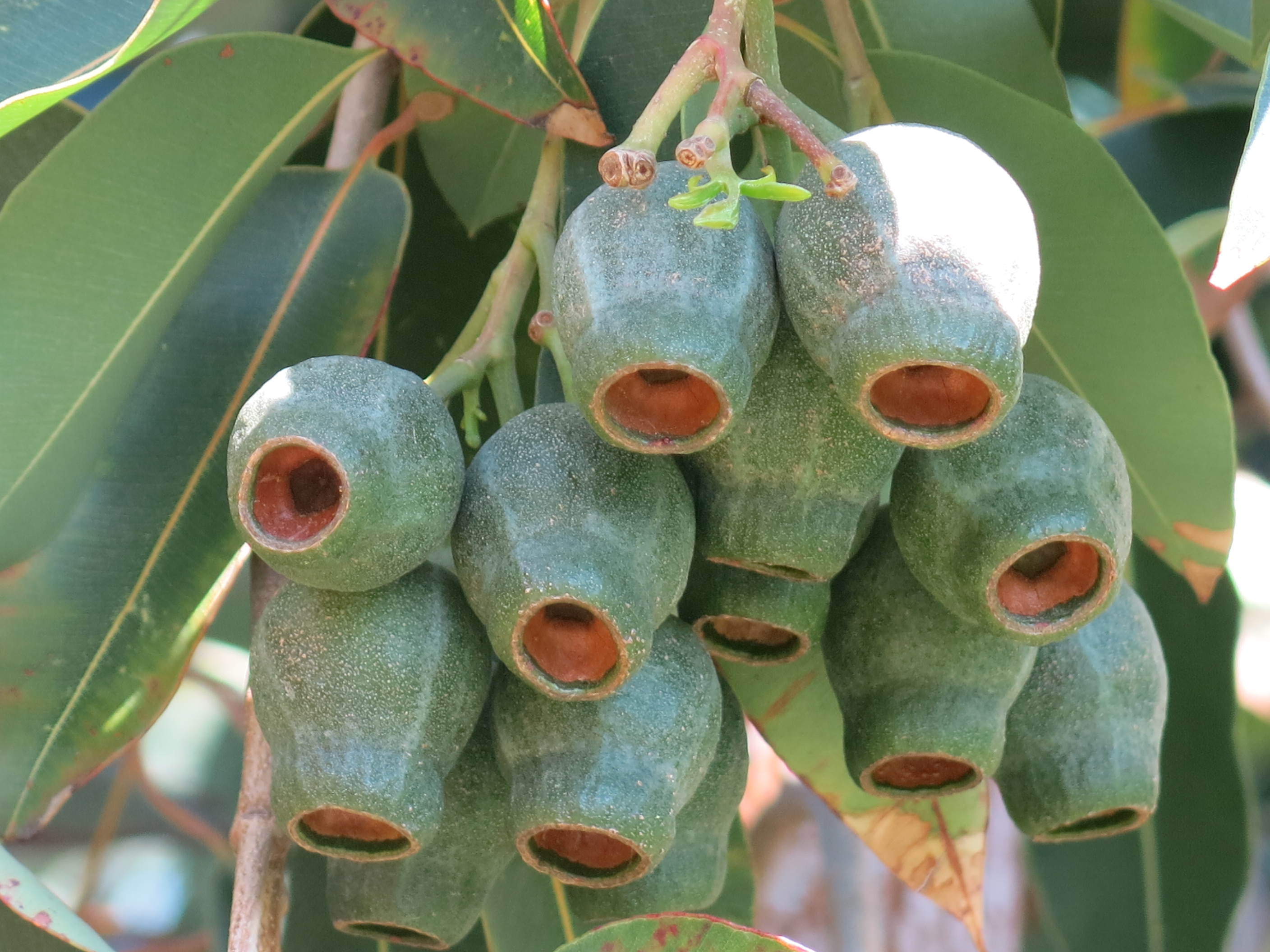
Fruit

Corymbia calophylla is a large tree, or a mallee in poor soil, that typically grows to a height of 40 metres (131 ft), but can reach over 60 metres (197 ft). The largest known individual specimen is 71 m (233 ft) tall, has a 10.8 m (35 ft) girth and a wood volume of 134 m^{3} (4,700 cu ft). The trunk of the tree may grow up to 2 m (6 ft 7 in) wide, the branches becoming large, thick and rambling. It has rough, tessellated, grey-brown to red-brown bark that extends over the length of the trunk and branches.

Adult leaves are arranged alternately, thick and glossy green on both sides, broadly lance-shaped to egg-shaped and tapered or rounded at the base. The leaf blade is 9 to 14 centimetres (4 to 6 in) long and 25 to 40 mm (1.0 to 1.6 in) wide with a narrowly flattened or channelled petiole 15 to 20 mm (0.6 to 0.8 in) long.

It blooms between December and May, producing white to pink flowers. The flower buds are arranged on the ends of branchlets on a branched peduncle that is circular or angled in cross-section. Each branch of the peduncle has buds in groups of three or seven on pedicels 6–37 mm (0.24–1.46 in) long. Mature buds are club-shaped or pear-shaped, 6–14 mm (0.24–0.55 in) long and 6–10 mm (0.24–0.39 in) wide with a flattened operculum. The fruits or gumnuts form later and can remain on the tree for a year or more. They are oval to urn-shaped, 30–50 mm (1.2–2.0 in) long and 25–40 mm (1.0–1.6 in) wide on a pedicel 7–40 mm (0.3–1.6 in) long. The gumnuts carry large seeds, which are an important food source for native bird species such as cockatoos. The tree propagates readily from seed. It is distinctive among bloodwoods for its very large buds and fruit, colloquially known as honky (or honkey) nuts in Western Australia.

== Taxonomy and naming ==
The name Eucalyptus calophylla was first published in 1831 by Robert Brown in Journal of the Royal Geographical Society of London, but without a description it was deemed to be a nomen nudum. Brown used a specimen grown at Kew to include the species in the family as Myrtaceae. He did not give a reason for the specific epithet (calophylla); however, Ferdinand von Mueller noted in 1879 that Brown "bestowed the specific name on this tree seemingly for a double reason, because the foliage is more beautiful than that of many other Eucalypts, and also because the venation of the leaves reminds of that of the tropical genus Calophyllum in the plants-order of Guttiferae".

The first formal description of E. calophylla was published in 1841 by John Lindley in Edwards Botanical Register. Seeds of the plant had been collected at "Augusta" by "Mrs. Molloy" and sent to "Capt. Jas. Mangles, R.N.", who was later a seed merchant.

Mueller placed the species with a series of "bloodwoods" in 1884, based on characteristics of the bark. Joseph Maiden's 1920 book, A Critical Revision of the Genus Eucalyptus, supported this arrangement.

In 1995 Ken Hill and Lawrie Johnson changed the name to Corymbia calophylla. In 2009, Carlos Parra-O and colleagues published a combined analysis of nuclear rDNA (ETS + ITS) and morphological characters to clarify relationships within the genus Corymbia. C. calophylla was found to form a natural group with two other Western Australian species C. ficifolia and C. haematoxylon. They classified the group as section Calophyllae within the subgenus Corymbia.

It is related and somewhat similar to Corymbia ficifolia, a red-flowered species endemic to the same region. C. calophylla differs in being larger (to about 50 metres (160 ft) high in the wild), having much larger buds and fruit, and flowers that are usually white—occasionally pink—instead of red. However, in some areas hybridisation makes identification difficult.

Common names include marri and Port Gregory gum, and a long-standing usage has been red gum due to the effusions of red sap often found on trunks. Red gum was recorded as a name in use by the Swan River colonists in 1835. Other species of Corymbia (then Eucalyptus) were referred to as "red gum", so to avoid ambiguity the Forestry Department of the Western Australian government nominated the extant name marri in the 1920s. Corymbia calophylla is still commonly known as a "eucalypt", despite the transfer to the new genus. The Noongar peoples know the tree as gardan, kurrden, mahree, marri, nandap or ngora. Second-hand reports of Indigenous names for "red gum" were reported by correspondents in The West Australian in 1929: the name kardun attributed to the Pinjarrah people and marri from the Blackwood region; marri boona was said to be a reference to the wood.

== Distribution ==
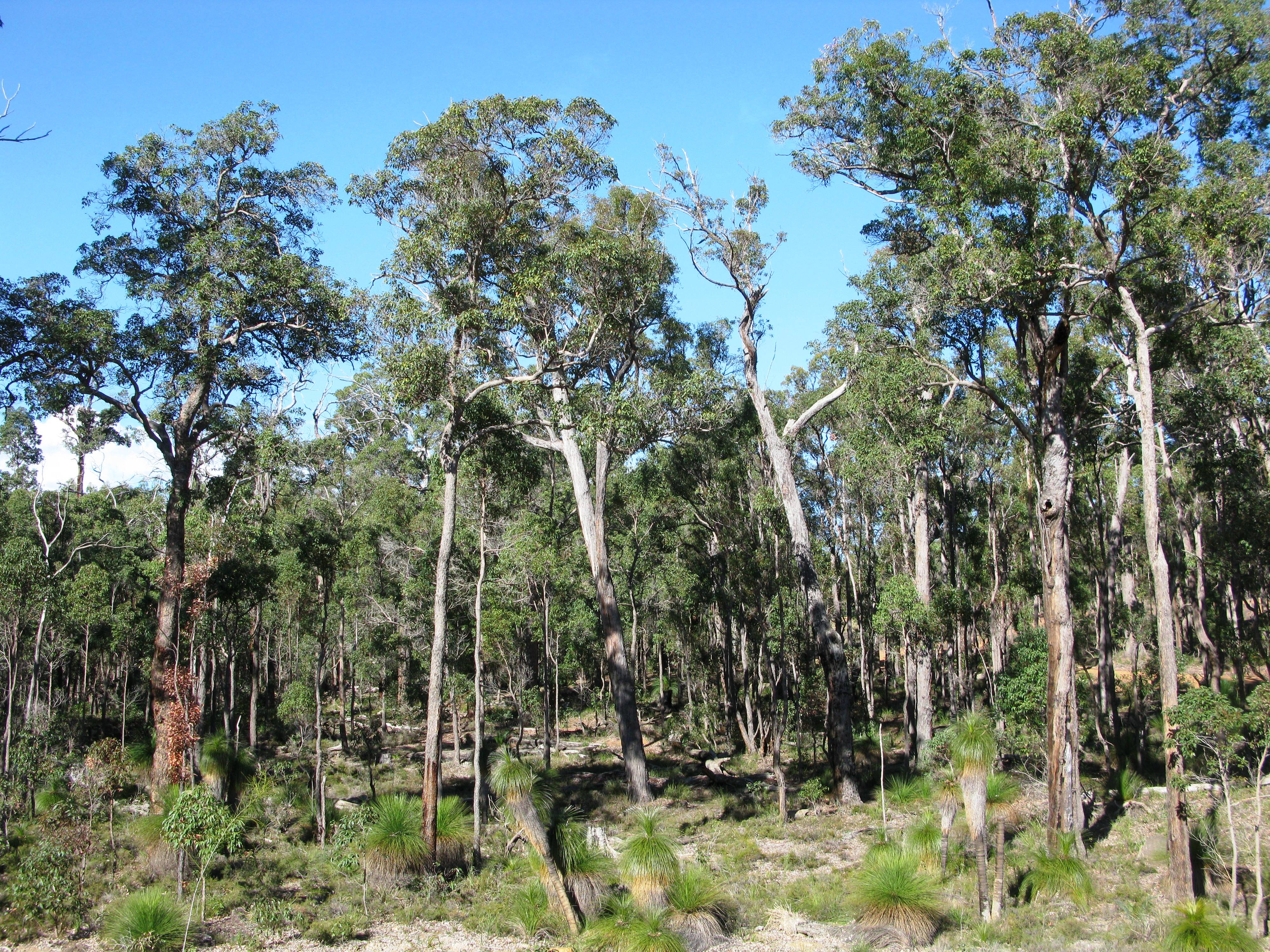
Jarrah and marri forest near the Blackwood River

Marri is widely distributed in the Southwest region of Western Australia, from north of Geraldton (28° S) to Cape Riche (34° S), and inland beyond Narrogin (32°56′S 117° E). It is found displaying its adaptability to the different environments on the Swan Coastal Plain and the Darling Scarp. Where the soil type is appropriate it will dominate as the upper storey in woodland, to within a few kilometres from the coast. The species will grow on comparatively poor soil, but good specimens are considered an indicator of the better agricultural soils. Found in a variety of terrains including flats, hills, breakaways, wetlands, fringing salt marshes and beside drainage lines, it is able to grow in red-brown clay loams, orange-brown sandy clays, gravel and grey sandy soils over limestone, granite or laterite.

== Ecology ==
Marri is regarded as one of the six forest giants found in Western Australia; the other trees include; Eucalyptus gomphocephala (tuart), E. diversicolor (karri), E. jacksonii (red tingle), E. marginata (jarrah) and E. patens (yarri).

It is a common species, though its population has been subject to large fluctuations due to changes in land use. It is a dominant tree of several vegetation types when in favourable soils and climates, with rich and sometimes intimate associations to other species.

The fruit and seeds are consumed by avian species, and it is a staple in the diet of long-billed black cockatoo (Zanda baudinii) and red-capped parrot (Purpureicephalus spurius). Both species prise marri seeds out of their woody capsule by manipulating it with the foot and lower mandible, and inserting the point of the upper mandible at openings in the seed-dispersing valve. The marks left by the lower mandible on the marri's nut distinguish the species of parrots and cockatoos.

Plant species associated with Corymbia calophylla in the mid-story include the tall shrub or tree Persoonia longifolia (snottygobble) and Kingia australis (bullanock) in jarrah-marri woodland, where it dominates the canopy with Eucalyptus marginata. Mid-story species can also include Corymbia haematoxylon, resembling C. calophylla in miniature. Eucalypts occurring in its range can be displaced; for example, in metropolitan Perth it overwhelms E. lane-poolei (salmon white gum) on all but wetter Guildford soils. On the drier coastal plain of its northern range, the size of the tree is only exceeded by tuart, (Eucalyptus gomphocephala). The species is named as one of the dominant taxa in Corymbia calophylla–Xanthorrhoea preissii woodlands and shrublands of the Swan Coastal Plain, a critically endangered ecological community, once widespread and now restricted to less than 3% of its range. One of three described marri dominated assemblages, this one is distinguished by the drier soils of the community's range along the eastern edge of the Swan Coastal Plain.

Old large trees became rare after extensive agricultural conversion of land during the twentieth century, but Mueller recorded specimens in the 1870s with trunks up to three metres in width. Removal of trees on farmland was found to be difficult, resisting labour-intensive mechanical methods and ringbarking. The cost-effective method, demonstrated in 1904 at an experimental farm in Narrogin, was to splinter the trunks and roots with gelignite.

== Conservation status ==
Corymbia calophylla is listed as not threatened by the Government of Western Australia Department of Biodiversity, Conservation and Attractions, but was added to the IUCN Red List as a near threatened species in 2019.

== Uses ==
Marri trees played a significant role in Noongar culture, the applications of its products were adapted and exported by the people occupying the Southwest of Australia.

The kino, mayat, which oozes from the tree contains tannins which have antiseptic qualities. Mayat was powdered and sprinkled onto open wounds to prevent bleeding, added to water for a mouthwash or disinfectant, mixed with clay and water and used as a medicinal drink for dysentery or used to tan kangaroo skins for cloaks or bags. The use as a remedy for diarrhoea by people of the region was noted by colonist Jane Dodds of Guildford, Western Australia, "as we do rhubarb but it does not answer for Europeans". Rosendo Salvado, the Spanish Bishop, contradicts this notion in reporting the efficacy of this remedy for a widespread problem in the new colony, taken in tea or as one or two small lozenges; he says the effect is produced in a day, but also warns that overdose can lead to paralysis. The use of the kino for tanning of animal skins was also adopted by European migrants. Early mentions in literature often remark on the blood-like appearance of the kino that flowed from the marri trees in their new environment — the Diary of George Fletcher Moore recording its use in 1831. The colony began to export the product to England. Mueller gave a price at markets in London of twenty to twenty five pounds per ton in 1879. The value of the product was recognised by a 1922 investigation of the state's forestry. A method was patented to improve the use as a tanning agent for commercial applications, increasing its solubility and removing colour. The composition of marri kino is about two thirds tannins, and is unusual in being harvestable without felling the tree.

Marri wood is used to make a variety of objects like doarks (sticks for knocking the tops off grass trees), kitjs (spears) and wannas (digging sticks). Marri timber is increasingly featured in modern household furniture. The timber is honey coloured and has a unique vein structure. However, it is not used in construction as the wood structure exhibits complex faults. Trees growing on alluvial soils contain less kino, producing timber with a wider range of applications. The value of marri lacking gum veins was propounded by the state conservator of forest John Ednie Brown in 1897, with a recommendation they be used for packaging fruit; however, the 1922 commission found that while useful for that purpose and others, the irregular faults reduced its utility. This view was reaffirmed by the state conservator in 1957, although the usefulness and high amount of tannin in marri kino was also noted. The wood's strength was utilised in the nineteenth century for handles, spokes and other implements, and applications in building construction, but found to deteriorate when used below ground. While the timber is unsuitable for permanent construction, the availability of the timber in the mid-twentieth century saw it recommended by the Forestry Department in lower cost housing and buildings, as scantling, in boat building, and in the construction of rolling stock for railways. The timber failed testing for use as railway sleepers.

The blossoms from the marri can be used as a source of sugary syrup, which can be sucked directly from the flower or can be dipped into water to make a sweet drink. The colonial botanist James Drummond noted the preparation of this drink, called numbit, in 1843. These blossoms also attract ngoowak (bees) and honey can be found in the hollows of its branches. These trees also attract birds which nest in the hollows, in which eggs can be found to eat.

The large and distinctive fruit produced by the tree is featured in the literature of May Gibbs, whose childhood in Western Australia arguably influenced her series on 'Gumnut babies'. The Noongar poet Jack Davis celebrated the importance of marri in his poem 'The Red Gum and I'.

=== Use in horticulture ===
The tree may be cultivated by sowing seeds directly at a site, or raised in pots to avoid damage to seedlings. The species is commercially available as seed or established plants. Seed is harvested from the fruit between February and March, when they are mature within an unopened capsule. While not as commonly used as the local peppermint tree in urban landscaping, the species has been selected for public spaces and as a street tree in the suburbs of Southwest Australia.

A tree at Kew Gardens, grown from seeds he had collected in 1802, were the specimens used by Robert Brown in his description of the species. Mueller noted in Eucalyptographia (1879) that the tree could be grown in tropical climes, giving John Kirk's report of its successful introduction to Zanzibar, but that its sensitivity to frost had accounted for its failure in Melbourne, Australia and other regions.

== Gallery ==
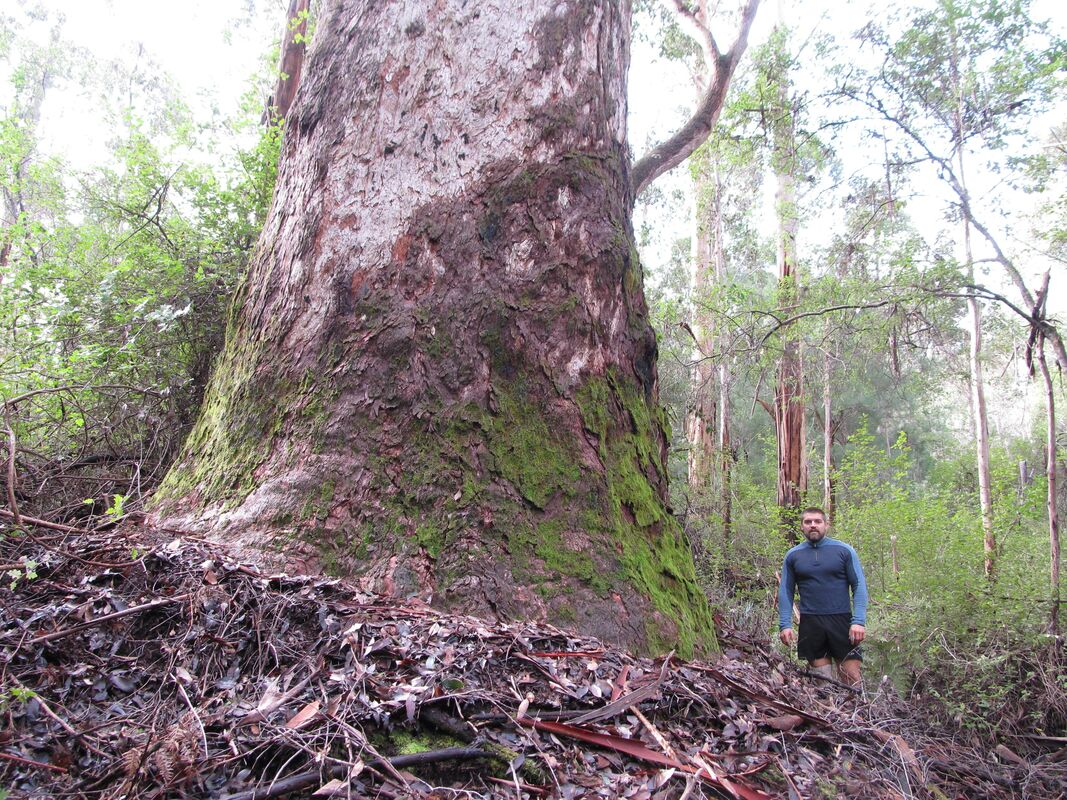
The Corymbia Giant, the tallest and largest marri

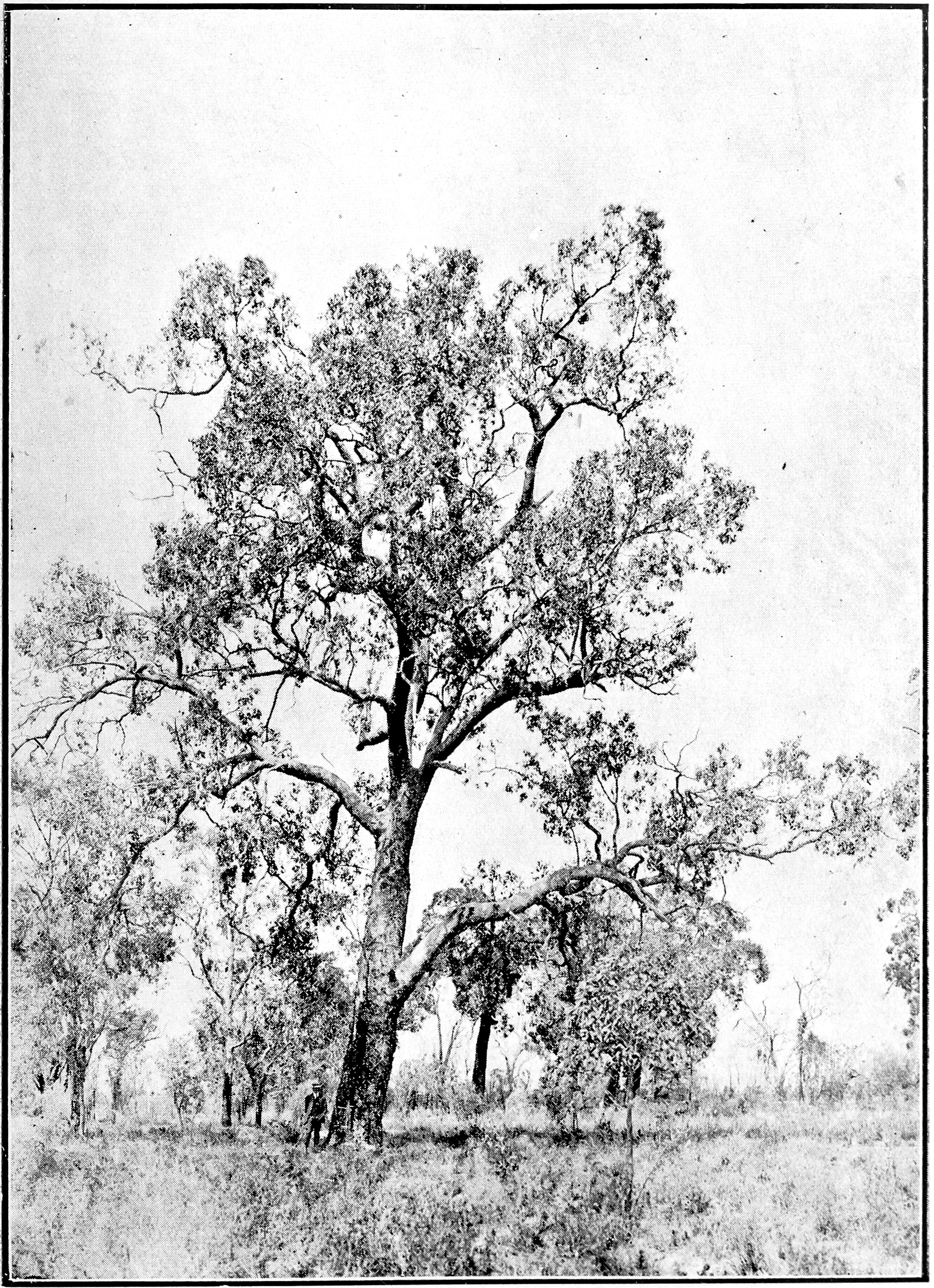
Mature tree with man at left, c. 1922

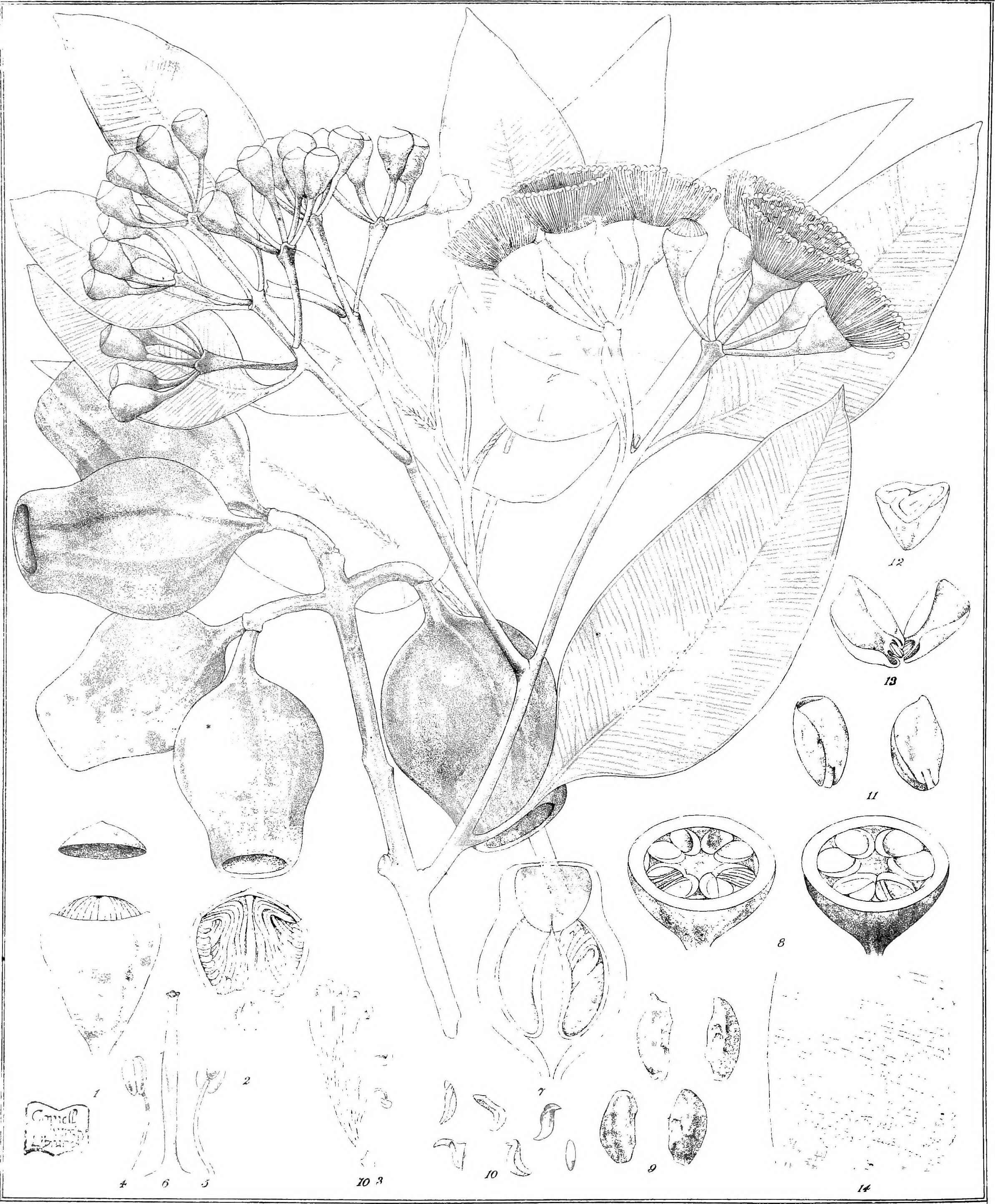
Botanical illustration in Mueller's Eucalyptographia
