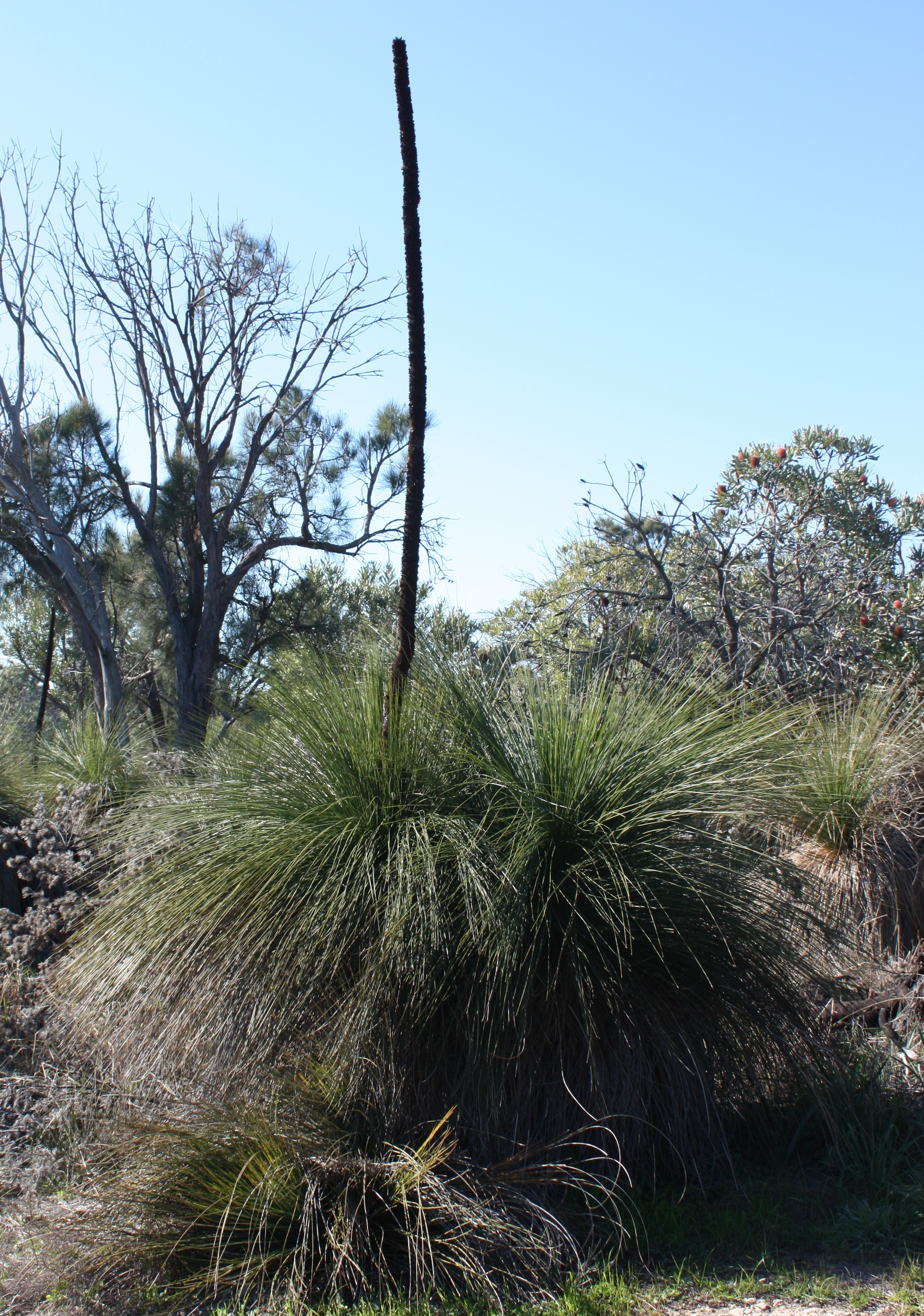

Scientific classification
- Kingdom: Plantae
- Clade: Tracheophytes
- Clade: Angiosperms
- Clade: Monocots
- Order: Asparagales
- Family: Asphodelaceae
- Subfamily: Xanthorrhoeoideae
- Genus: Xanthorrhoea
- Species: X. preissii

Binomial name
- Xanthorrhoea preissii Endl.

Synonyms
- Xanthorrhoea pecoris F.Muell.; Xanthorrhoea reflexa Endl.

= Xanthorrhoea preissii =

Species of flowering plant endemic to Western Australia

Xanthorrhoea preissii, known as balga, is a widespread species of perennial monocot in Southwest Australia.

== Description ==
The form of the plant resembles a tree, with very long and bunched, grass-like, leaves that emerge from a central base.

The trunk may grow over 3 metres (9.8 ft) tall, and the often blackened appearance is evidence of its ability to withstand fire. The remains of the flammable leaves and the annual regrowth produce banding, allowing the age of the plant to be determined, and giving a record of previous fires in its habitat. The inflorescence appears on an upright spike, 1.5 to 2.5 metres (4 ft 11 in to 8 ft 2 in) long, between June and December. The sessile flowers, creamy or white, appear more profusely when stimulated by bushfire.

== Taxonomy ==
The name balga is derived from the Nyungar language. This species and other members of the genus Xanthorrhoea are colloquially called grasstrees, and in the past also blackboys. The appearance of the plant was seen by the early British settlers of the region as resembling an Aboriginal person holding a spear. However, today the term blackboy is recognised as inappropriate.

A description published in 1920, Xanthorrhoea reflexa D.A.Herb., is cited as a taxonomic synonym for this species, as is the name Xanthorrhoea pecoris F.Muell. The species description was first published by Stephan Endlicher in the 1846 volume of Plantae Preissianae.

== Distribution ==
It is found throughout coastal plains, near watercourses, and inland forest regions, in a range extending from Geraldton to Albany and in the Avon Wheatbelt. It occurs on a wide variety of soil types and is sometimes associated with laterite and granite.

== Ecology ==
The species is named as one of the dominant taxa in Corymbia calophylla – Xanthorrhoea preissii woodlands and shrublands of the Swan Coastal Plain, a critically endangered ecological community, once widespread and now restricted to a narrow range. Its occurrence is a characteristic of two other marri (Corymbia calophylla) communities, but the marri/Xanthorrhoea community is distinguished by the drier soils of the communities range along the eastern edge of the Swan Coastal Plain.

== Uses ==
The species had a high economic importance to the Noongar people, who named it balga, utilising the gum it contains, the spike for fish spears, and the bardi grub as a source of food. Anecdotal information on the species refers to an association with fire in the culture of those people.

== Gallery ==
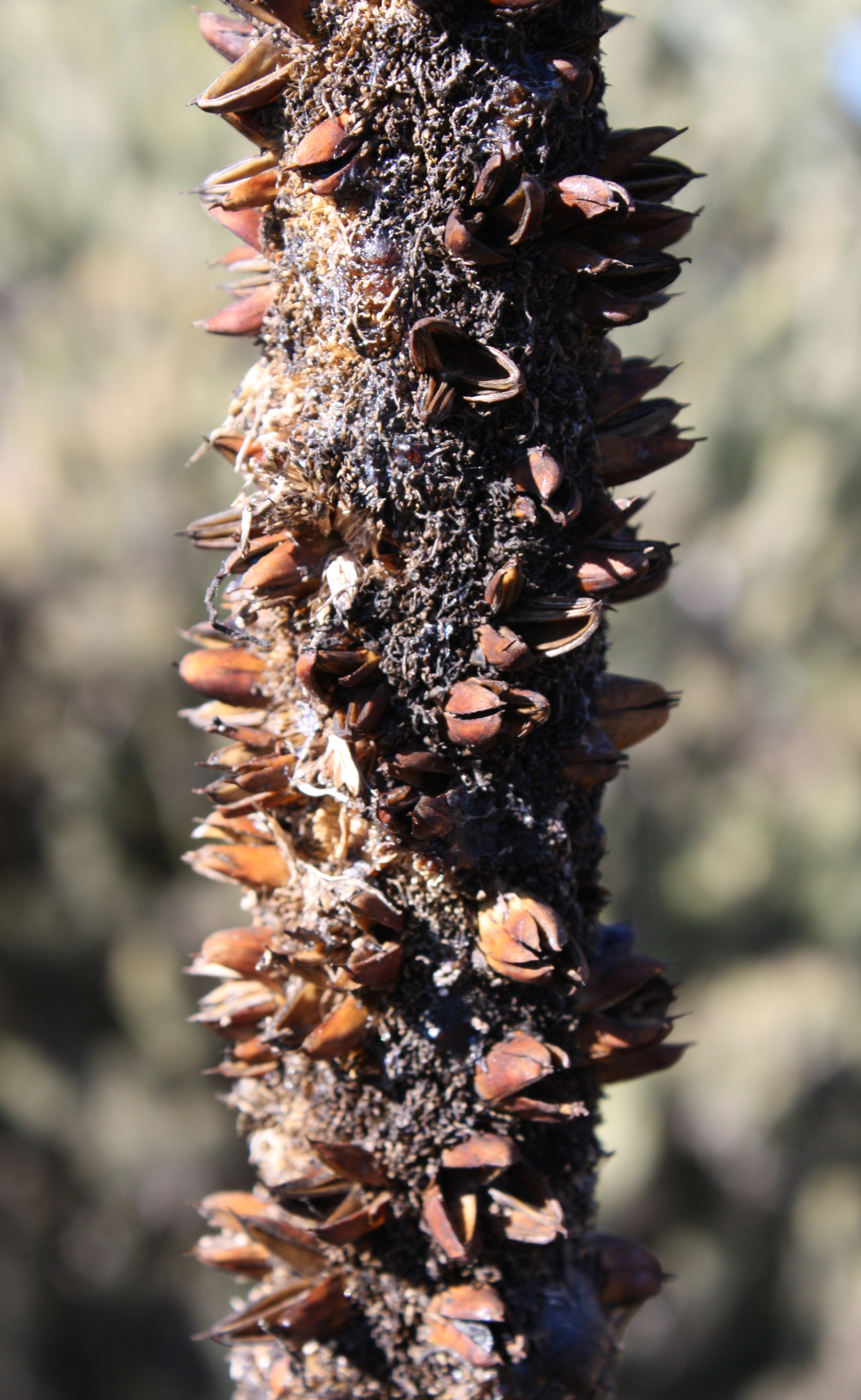
Closeup of flower spike

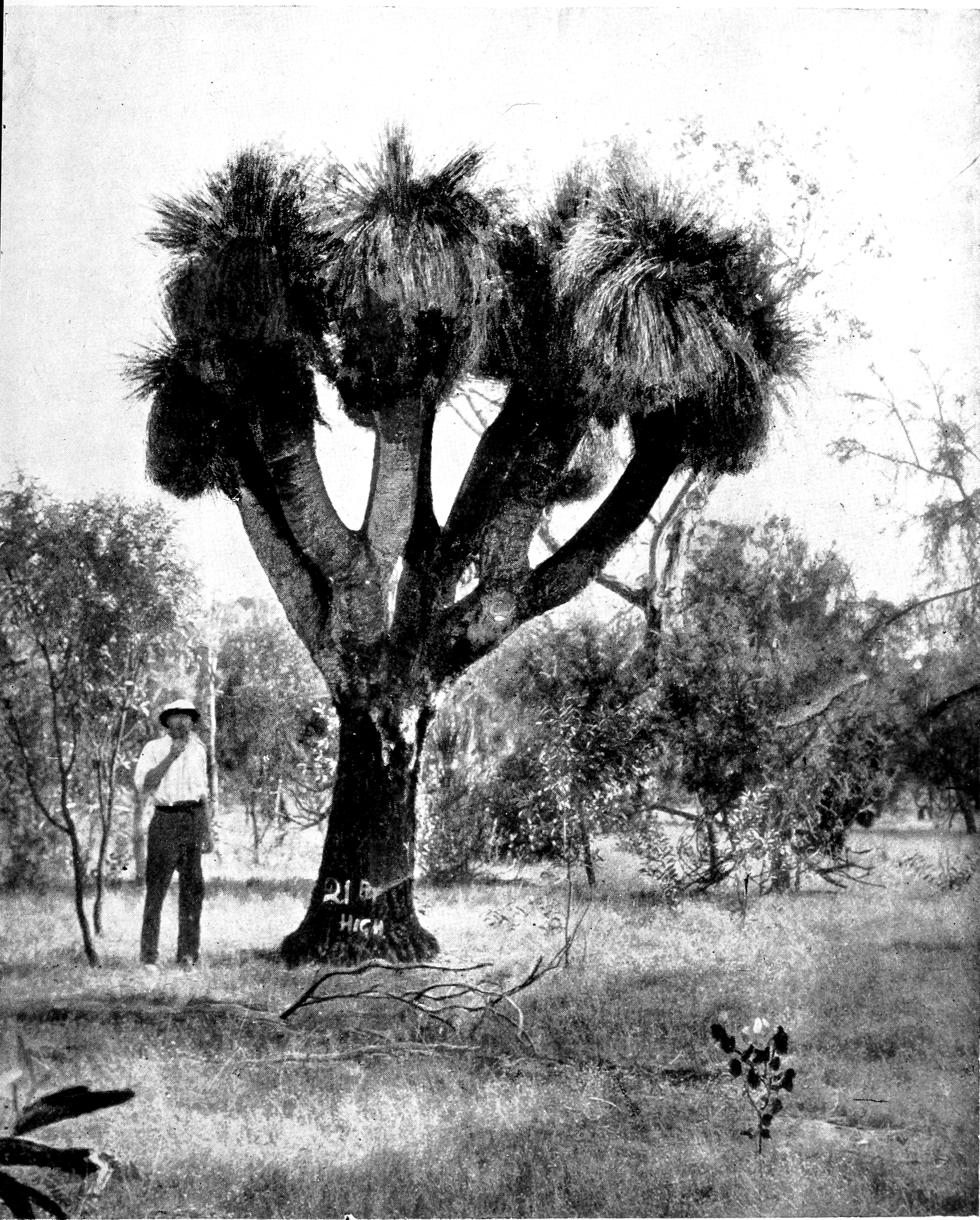
A 21-foot-high (6.4 m) specimen, c. 1920

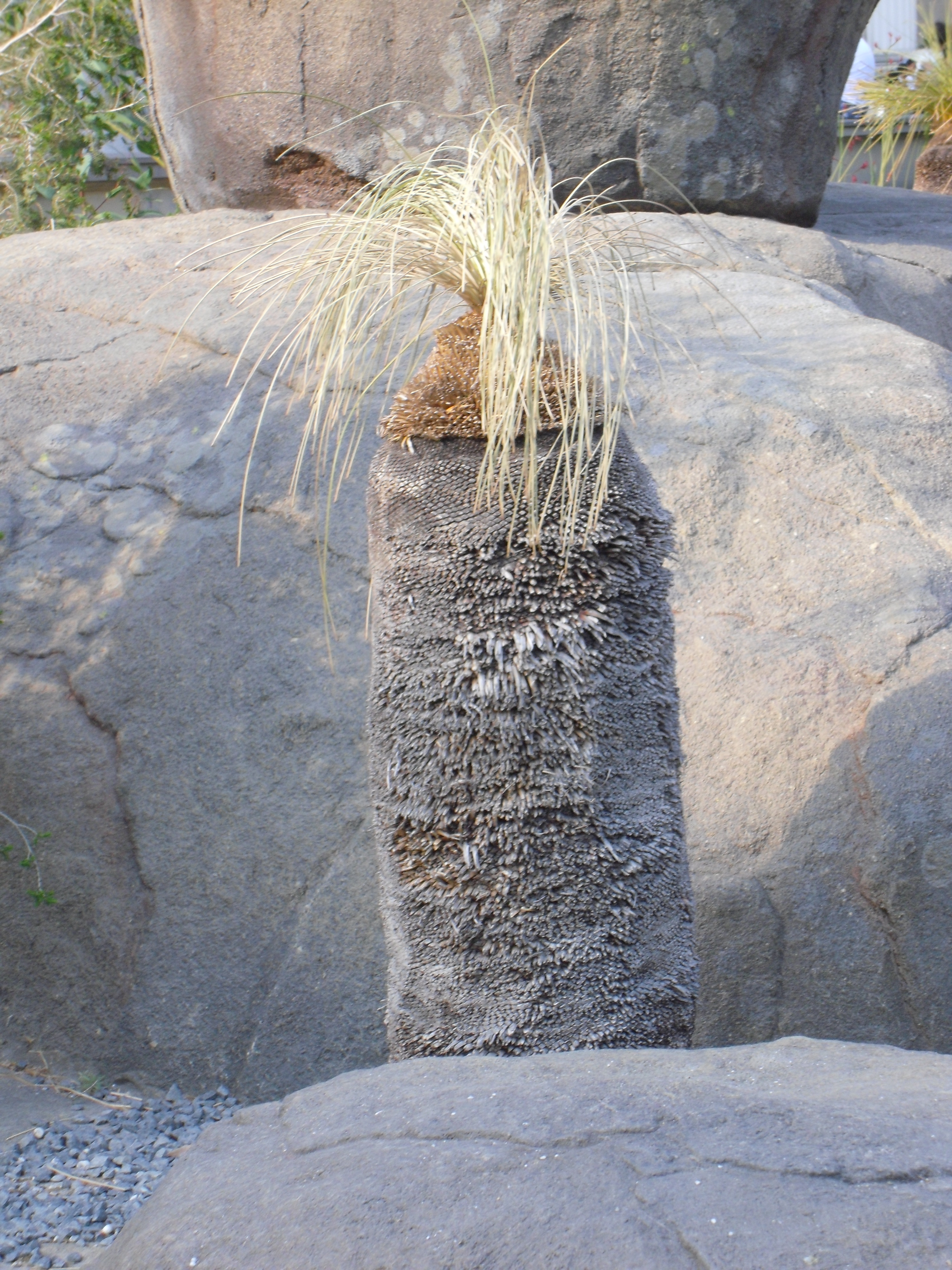
British Museum display (May 2010)

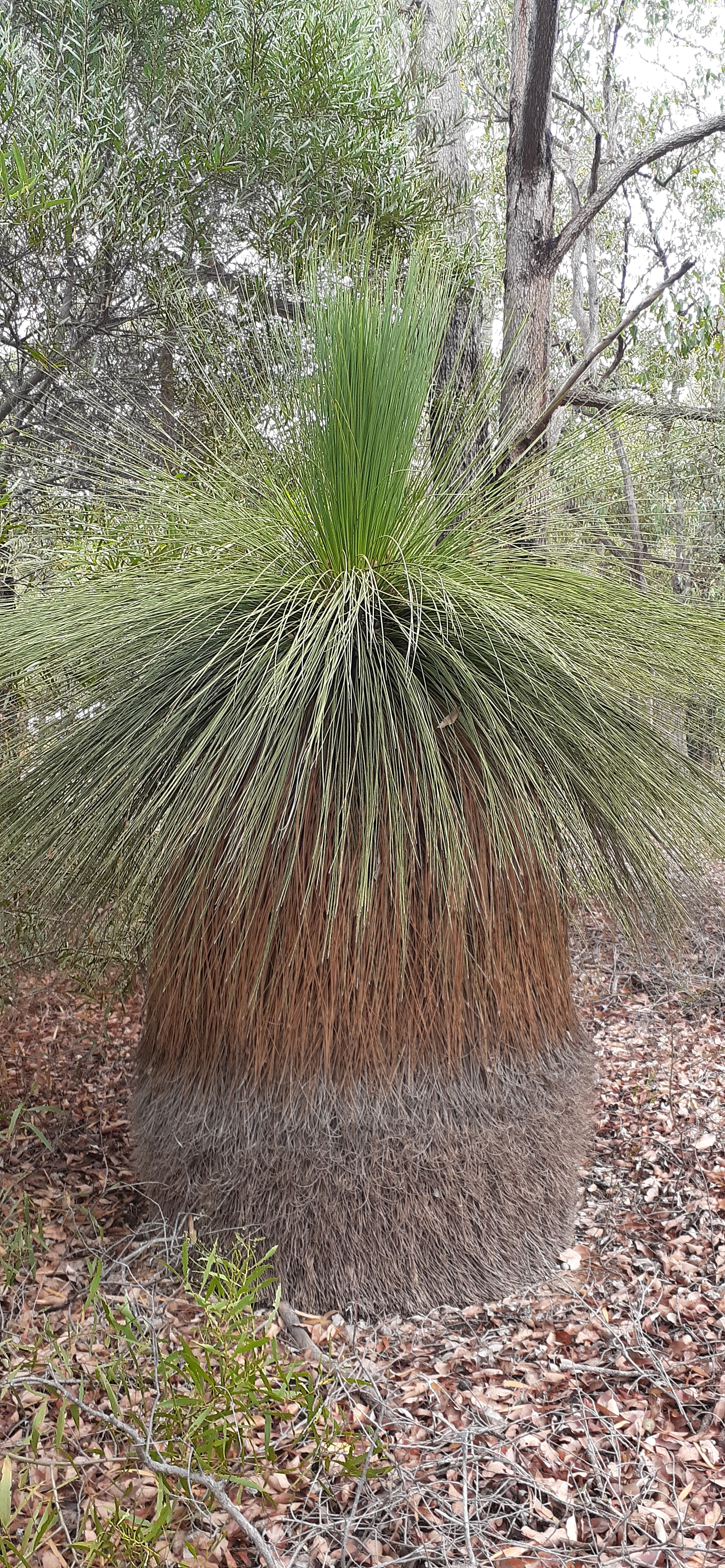
Xanthorrhoea with full leaf skirt

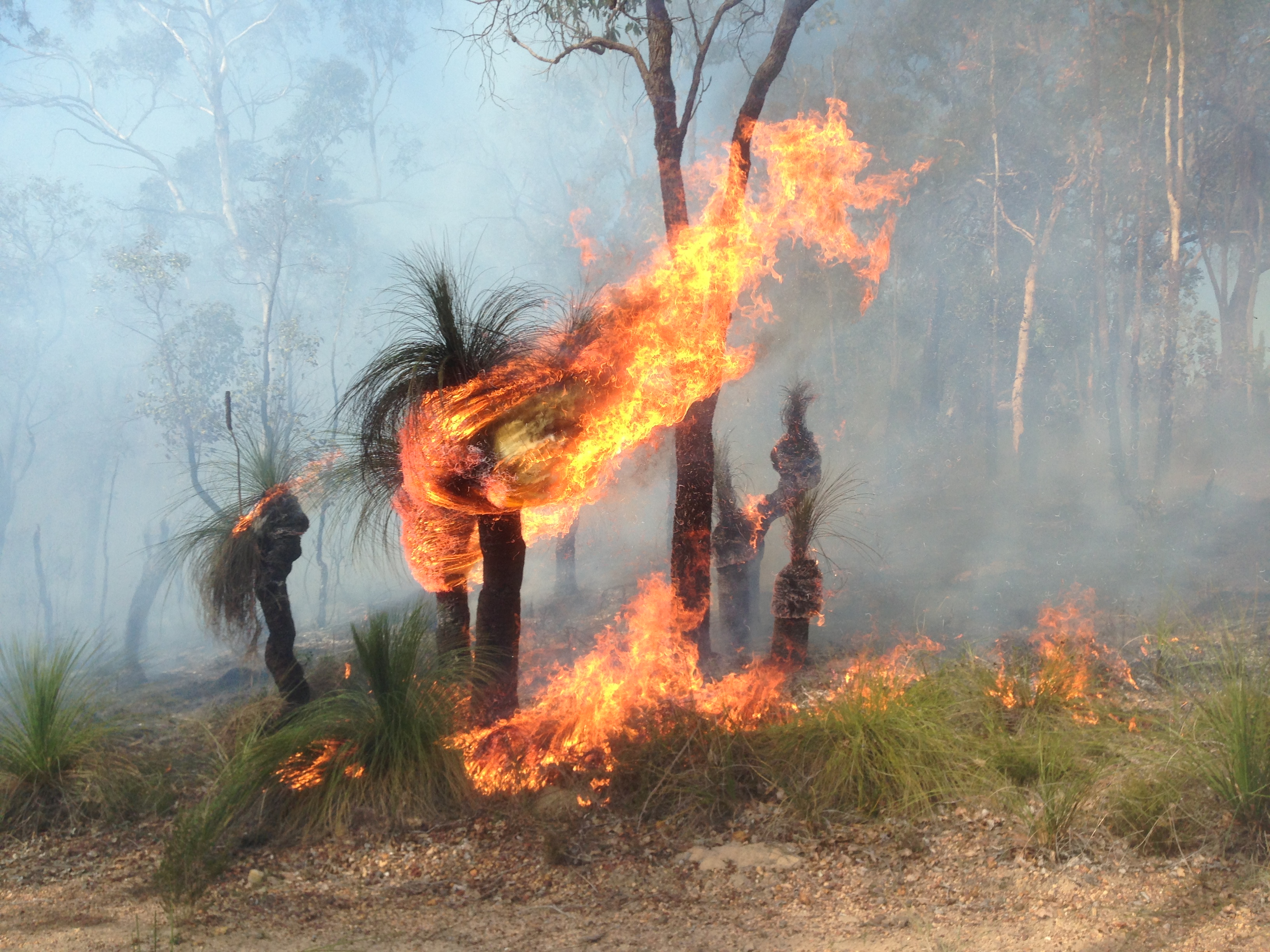
Xanthorrhoea on fire during a controlled burn, Mundaring
