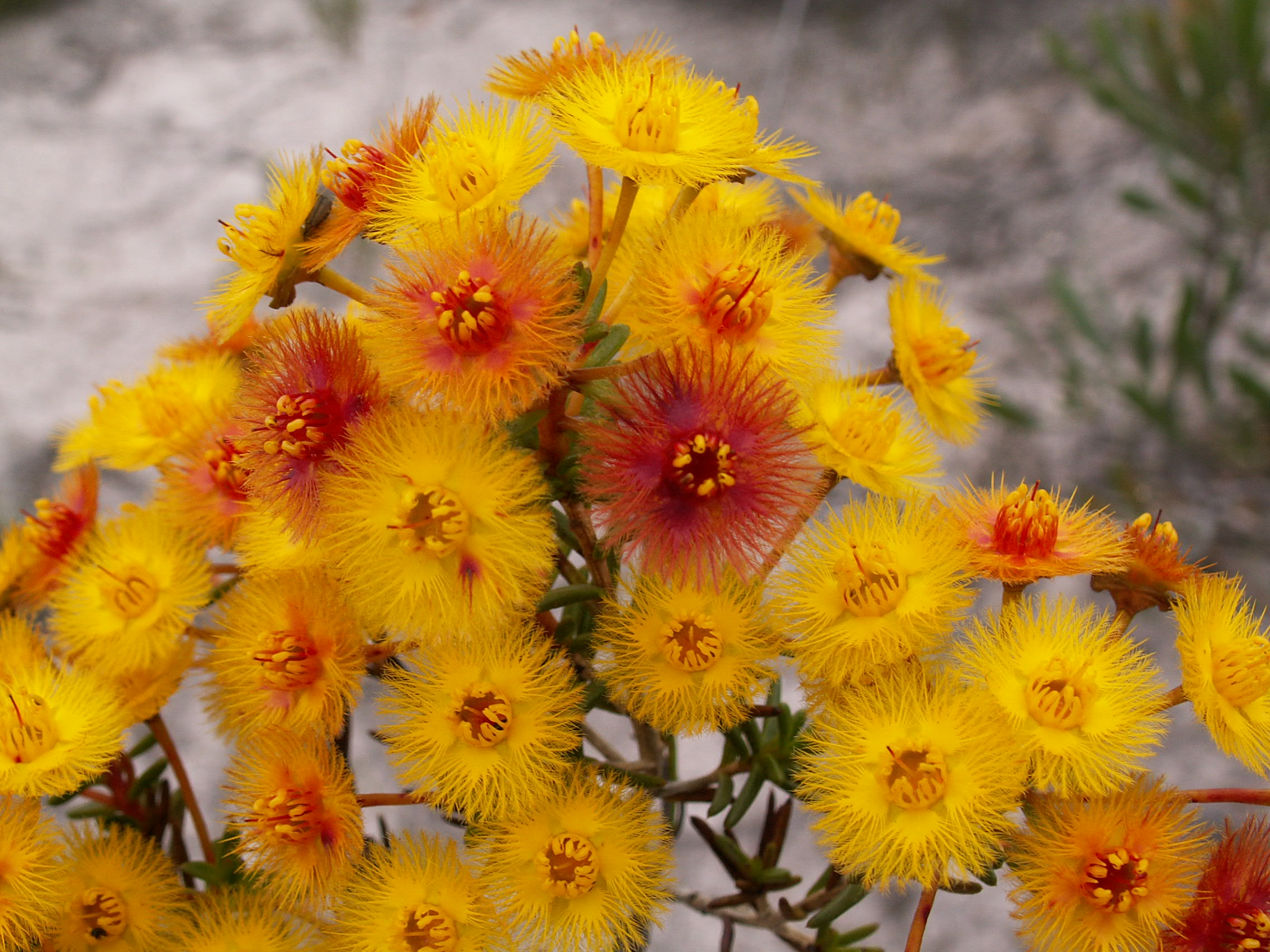
- Verticordia endlicheriana var. manicula growing near Mount Lesueur

Scientific classification
- Kingdom: Plantae
- Clade: Tracheophytes
- Clade: Angiosperms
- Clade: Eudicots
- Clade: Rosids
- Order: Myrtales
- Family: Myrtaceae
- Genus: Verticordia
- Species: V. endlicheriana
- Variety: V. e. var. manicula

Trinomial name
- Verticordia endlicheriana var. manicula A.S.George

= Verticordia endlicheriana var. manicula =

Variety of flowering plant

Verticordia endlicheriana var. manicula is a flowering plant in the myrtle family, Myrtaceae and is endemic to the south-west of Western Australia. It is usually a small, compact shrub with sweetly-perfumed, lemon-yellow flowers which change colour through red to brown as they age.

== Description ==
Verticordia endlicheriana var. manicula is usually a small compact shrub growing to a height of 20–50 cm (8–20 in) and a width of 20–40 cm (8–20 in) but which sometimes grows to 1 m (3 ft) high and wide, although it is usually more openly branched than var. compacta. The leaves on the stems are linear in shape and 4–8 mm (0.2–0.3 in) long while those near the leaves are egg-shaped to almost round and 2–4 mm (0.08–0.2 in) long.

The flowers are sweetly-perfumed and arranged in round or corymb-like groups on erect stalks from 5–12 mm (0.2–0.5 in) long. The floral cup is broad top-shaped, 0.6–0.8 mm (0.02–0.03 in) long, ribbed and glabrous. The sepals are lemon-yellow, 2.8–3.0 mm (0.11–0.12 in) long, with 6 to 8 hairy lobes and change colour through red, to brown and almost black as they age. The petals are a similar colour to the sepals, 3.5–4 mm (0.1–0.2 in), their main body is 0.4–0.7 mm (0.02–0.03 in) wide and they have long, pointed, finger-like appendages. The style is 1.7–2.1 mm (0.07–0.08 in) long, straight and glabrous. Flowering occurs from September to November.

== Taxonomy and naming ==
Verticordia endlicheriana was first formally described by Johannes Conrad Schauer in 1844 and the description was published in Lehmann's Plantae Preissianae. In 1991, Alex George undertook a review of the genus Verticordia and described five varieties of Verticordia endlicheriana including this variety. The type collection for this variety was gathered near Carnamah by Alex George and Elizabeth Berndt. The varietal name "manicula" is derived from a Latin word meaning little hand referring to the hand-like shape of the petals.

== Distribution and habitat ==
This variety usually grows in sand with gravel, as well as gravelly loam, often with other verticordias, in heath and shrubland. It occurs from north of Mingenew to Moore River in the south and to Morawa, Goomalling and Dowerin in the Avon Wheatbelt, Geraldton Sandplains and Swan Coastal Plain in the biogeographic regions.

== Conservation ==
Verticordia endlicheriana var. manicula is classified as "not threatened" by the Western Australian Government Department of Parks and Wildlife.

== Use in horticulture ==
This verticordia is attractive, even as the flowers change colour, which they do over a longer period than var. endlicheriana. It has been propagated from cuttings and has grown well in full sun with an occasional light pruning.
