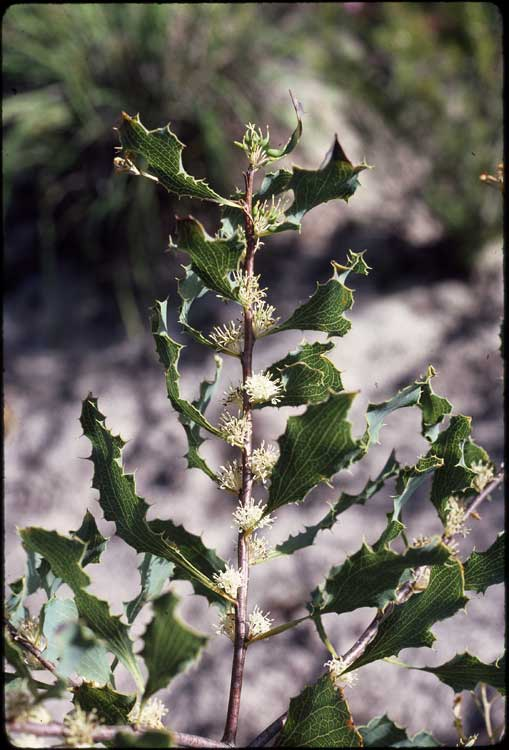
- Hakea neurophylla in Kings Park

Conservation status
- Priority Four — Rare Taxa (DEC)

Scientific classification
- Kingdom: Plantae
- Clade: Tracheophytes
- Clade: Angiosperms
- Clade: Eudicots
- Order: Proteales
- Family: Proteaceae
- Genus: Hakea
- Species: H. neurophylla

Binomial name
- Hakea neurophylla Meisn.
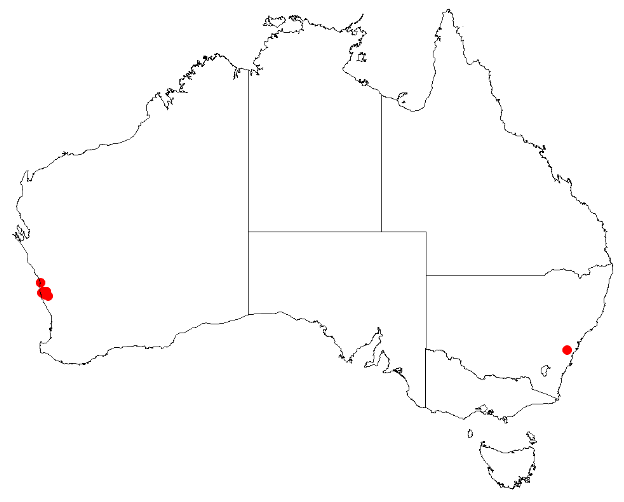
- Occurrence data from AVH

= Hakea neurophylla =

Pink-flowered hakea

Species of shrub endemic to Western Australia

Hakea neurophylla, commonly known as the pink-flowered hakea, is a shrub of the genus Hakea native to a small area near Dandaragan in the Wheatbelt region of Western Australia.

== Description ==
An erect non-sprouting shrub typically grows to a height of 0.3 to 2 metres (1 to 7 ft). Racemes of fragrant blooms appear from July to August in profusion in white or pale pink-red along the branchlets in the leaf axils. Inflorescences are solitary with 12 to 18 scented flowers with glabrous pedicels. Blue-grey leaves are obovate to elliptic and sometimes undulate 5 to 11 centimetres (2 to 4 in) long and 16 to 43 millimetres (0.6 to 1.7 in) wide and narrowly cuneate at the base. Leaves have 3 prominent longitudinal veins on both sides ending in a blunt point. Large blackish-brown fruit are obliquely ovate, from 3 to 4 centimetres (1.2 to 1.6 in) long and 1.5 to 1.9 centimetres (0.6 to 0.7 in) wide, obscurely beaked, with a dorsal longitudinal ridge on each valve.

== Taxonomy and naming ==
Hakea neurophylla was first formally described by Carl Meisner in 1855. Named from the Greek word neuron - nerve and phyllon leaf, a reference to the prominent veins in the leaves.

== Distribution and habitat ==
Hakea neurophylla is a rare species restricted to the Mt Lesueur - Eneabba area north of Perth in heathland sand over laterite usually on ridge tops.

== Conservation status ==
Hakea neurophylla is classified as "Priority Four" by the Western Australian Government Department of Parks and Wildlife, meaning that it is rare or near threatened.
