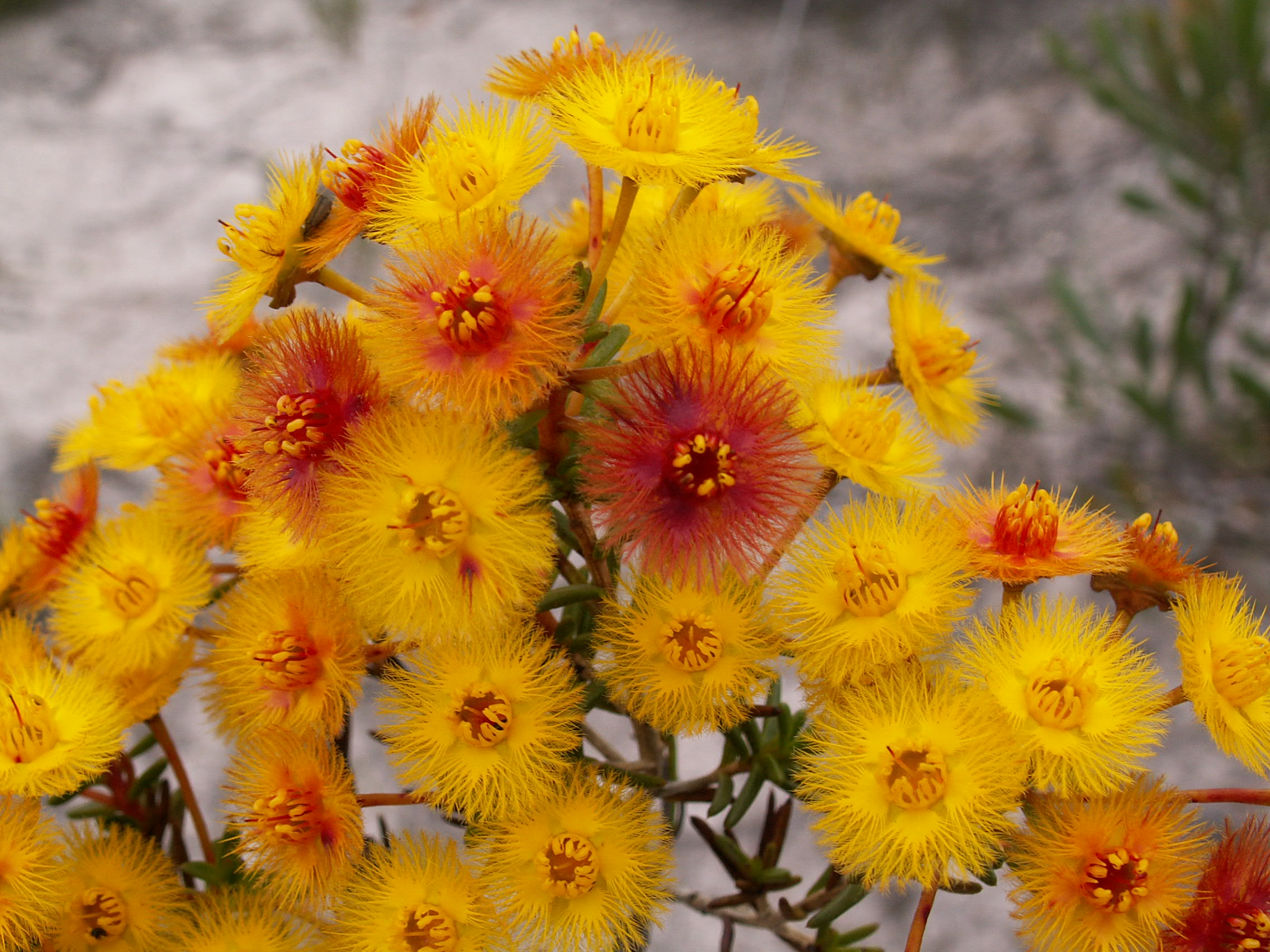
- On Mount Lesueur

Scientific classification
- Kingdom: Plantae
- Clade: Tracheophytes
- Clade: Angiosperms
- Clade: Eudicots
- Clade: Rosids
- Order: Myrtales
- Family: Myrtaceae
- Genus: Verticordia
- Species: V. endlicheriana Schauer
- Variety: V. e. var. endlicheriana

Trinomial name
- Verticordia endlicheriana var. endlicheriana

= Verticordia endlicheriana var. endlicheriana =

Species of flowering plant

Verticordia endlicheriana var. endlicherliana is a flowering plant in the myrtle family, Myrtaceae and is endemic to the south-west of Western Australia. It is a small, compact shrub with mostly narrow leaves and golden-yellow flowers which age to reddish brown.

== Description ==
Verticordia endlicheriana var. endlicheriana is a more or less compact shrub which grows to a height of 10–70 cm (4–30 in) and a width of 10–80 cm (4–30 in), with one to several main stems at the base. Its leaves on the stems are linear in shape, while those near the flowers are oblong to almost round and 2–4 mm (0.08–0.2 in) long.

The flowers are unscented and arranged in round or corymb-like groups on erect stalks from 5–12 mm (0.2–0.5 in) long. The floral cup is a broad top-shaped, 0.9–1.3 mm (0.04–0.05 in) long, ribbed and glabrous. The sepals are golden-yellow, turning reddish brown with age, 3–3.5 mm (0.12–0.14 in) long, with 6 to 8 hairy lobes. The petals are a similar colour to the sepals, 2.5–4.0 mm (0.1–0.2 in) long and have long, pointed, finger-like appendages. The style is 1.5–2.5 mm (0.06–0.1 in) long, straight and glabrous. Flowering occurs from August to November.

== Taxonomy and naming ==
The species Verticordia endlicheriana was first formally described by Johannes Conrad Schauer in 1844 and the description was published in Lehmann's Plantae Preissianae. In 1991, Alex George undertook a review of the genus Verticordia and described five varieties of Verticordia endlicheriana including this variety.

== Distribution and habitat ==
This variety grows in sand with gravel, loam or clay near granite outcrops in heath and wandoo woodland. It occurs in areas between the Beaufort River, Cranbrook, Tambellup, Albany and the Arthur River with disjunct populations near Corrigin, Kulin, Koonadgin and Mount Hampton. There areas are within the Avon Wheatbelt, Esperance Plains, Jarrah Forest and Mallee biogeographic regions.

== Conservation ==
Verticordia endlicheriana var. endlicheriana is classified as "not threatened" by the Western Australian Government Department of Parks and Wildlife.

== Use in horticulture ==
This variety is well-established in gardens and some specimens have grown for more than 9 years. It has usually been propagated from cuttings and has been grown in a range of soils, although it is usually slow-growing. A light annual pruning encourages the production of flowers.
