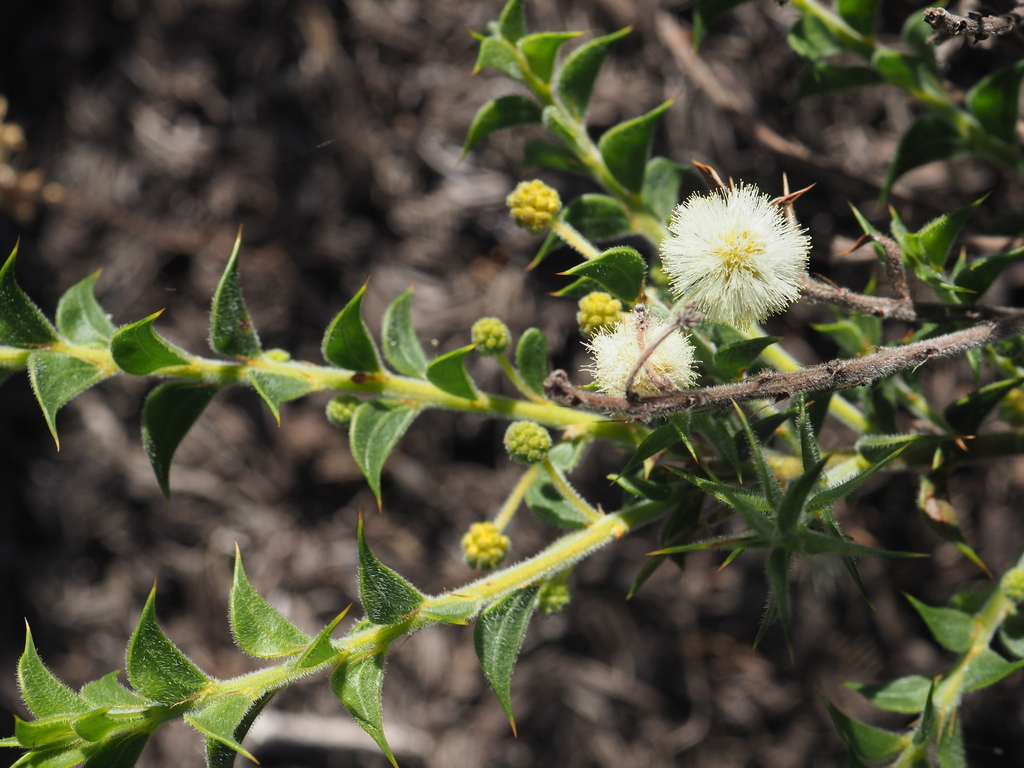

Scientific classification
- Kingdom: Plantae
- Clade: Tracheophytes
- Clade: Angiosperms
- Clade: Eudicots
- Clade: Rosids
- Order: Fabales
- Family: Fabaceae
- Subfamily: Caesalpinioideae
- Clade: Mimosoid clade
- Genus: Acacia
- Species: A. huegelii

Binomial name
- Acacia huegelii Benth.
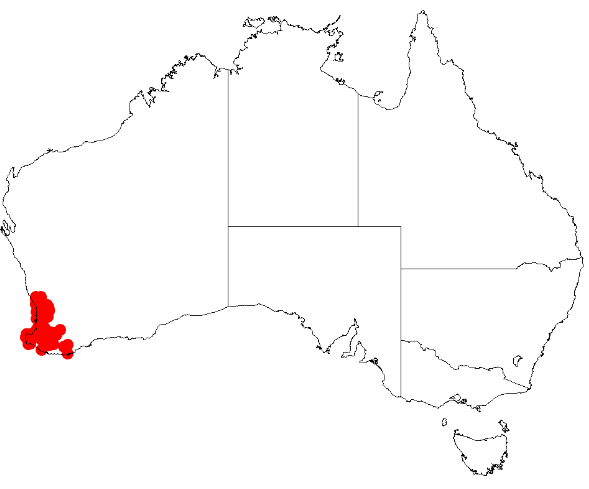
- Occurrence data from AVH

Synonyms
- Acacia eugelii Jacque orth. var.; Acacia huegelii Benth. var. huegelii; Acacia hugelii Benth. orth. var.; Actinotus sp. Whicher (G.J.Keighery 12413); Racosperma huegelii (Benth.) Pedley

= Acacia huegelii =

Species of legume

Acacia huegelii, commonly known as Huegel's wattle, is a species of flowering plant in the family Fabaceae and is endemic to the south-west of Western Australia. It is a straggling, semi-prostrate to erect, spiny shrub with sharply pointed phyllodes, one edge straight and the other edge convex, spherical heads of cream-coloured or white flowers and more or less flat, curved and leathery pods.

== Description ==
Acacia huegelii is straggling, semi-prostrate to erect, spiny shrub that typically grows to a height of 0.2–1.0 m (7.9 in – 3 ft 3.4 in) and has many stems. Its phyllodes are sharply pointed, 7–16 mm (0.28–0.63 in) and 2–7 mm (0.079–0.276 in) wide, broadest near or above the middle, the lower edge more or less straight, the upper margin conspicuously rounded with a prominent midrib. There are erect, bristly stipules 2–4 mm (0.079–0.157 in) long at the base of the phyllodes. The flowers are borne in a spherical head in axils on a peduncle normally 6–12 mm (0.24–0.47 in) long, each head with 20 to 35 cream-coloured or white flowers. Flowering occurs from October to February, and the pods are more or less flat, curved, up to 40 mm (1.6 in) long, 3.5–5.0 mm (0.14–0.20 in) wide, leathery and red-brown. The seeds ar oblong, about 4 mm (0.16 in) long and mottled, with a whitish, conical aril on the end.

== Taxonomy ==
Acacia huegelii was first formally described in 1837 by George Bentham in Enumeratio plantarum quas in Novae Hollandiae ora austro-occidentali ad fluvium Cygnorum et in sinu Regis Georgii collegit Carolus Liber Baro de Hügel from specimens collected near the Swan River by Charles von Hügel. The specific epithet (huegelii) honours the collector of the type specimens.

This species is closely related to A. forrestiana and has similar phyllodes to A. imparilis.

== Distribution and habitat ==
Huegel's wattle grows in sand in Banksia or Eucalyptus woodlands or open forest, sometimes between dunes with Agonis flexuosa and species of Kunzea, from the Moore River, south to Collie and Yallingup and from Northcliffe and Kendenup in the Avon Wheatbelt, Jarrah Forest, Swan Coastal Plain and Warren bioregions of south-western Western Australia.

== See also ==
- List of Acacia species
