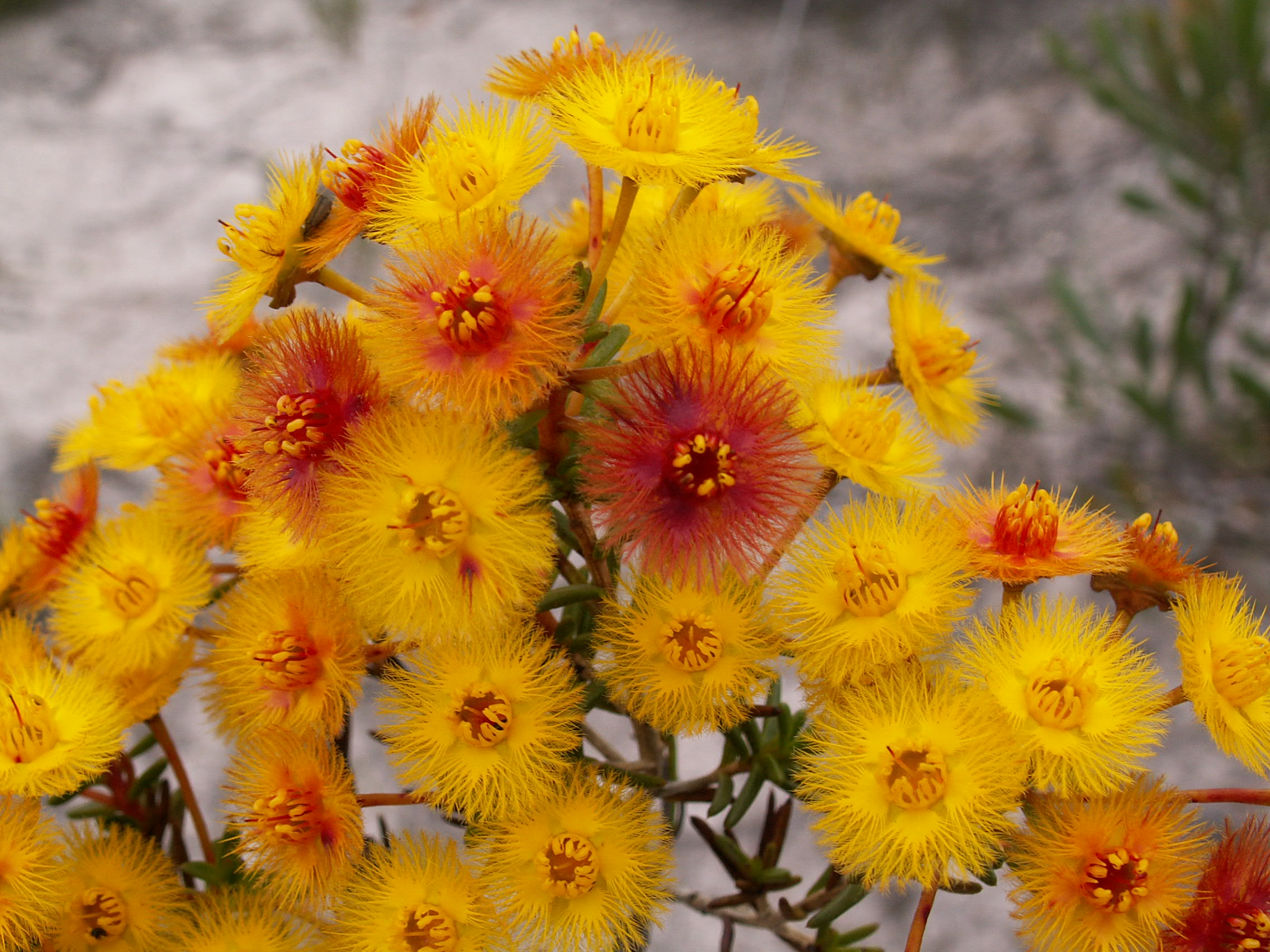
- V. endlicheriana var. endlicheriana growing near Mount Lesueur

Scientific classification
- Kingdom: Plantae
- Clade: Tracheophytes
- Clade: Angiosperms
- Clade: Eudicots
- Clade: Rosids
- Order: Myrtales
- Family: Myrtaceae
- Genus: Verticordia
- Subgenus: Verticordia subg. Chrysoma
- Section: Verticordia sect. Chrysoma
- Species: V. endlicheriana

Binomial name
- Verticordia endlicheriana Schauer

= Verticordia endlicheriana =

Species of shrub

Verticordia endlicheriana is a flowering plant in the myrtle family, Myrtaceae and is endemic to the south-west of Western Australia. It is a shrub with narrow leaves and yellow flowers which in some varieties age to red. It is a variable species and in his 1991 paper, Alex George formally described five varieties.

== Description ==
Verticordia endlicheriana is a shrub which grows to a height of 1 m (3 ft) with one to several main stems at the base. Its leaves on the stems are linear in shape, dished to almost round in cross-section, 2–4 mm (0.08–0.2 in) long and have a pointed end. The leaves near the flowers are oblong to almost round and 2–4 mm (0.08–0.2 in) long.

The flowers are sometimes scented and are arranged in round or corymb-like groups on erect stalks from 5–12 mm (0.2–0.5 in) long. The floral cup is a broad top shape, 0.5–1.5 mm (0.02–0.06 in) long, ribbed and glabrous. The sepals are yellow, turning red with age in some varieties, 3–4 mm (0.1–0.2 in) long, with 6 to 8 hairy lobes. The petals are a similar colour to the sepals, 2.5–4.5 mm (0.1–0.2 in) long and have long, pointed, finger-like appendages. The style is 1.5–2.5 mm (0.06–0.1 in) long, straight and glabrous. Flowering time differs, depending on the variety.

== Taxonomy and naming ==
Verticordia endlicheriana was first formally described by Johannes Conrad Schauer in 1844 and the description was published in Lehmann's Plantae Preissianae. The type specimen was collected by Ludwig Preiss near Cape Riche. The specific epithet (endlicheriana) honours the botanist Stephan Endlicher.

Alex George undertook a review of the genus Verticordia in 1991 and described five varieties of this species:

- Verticordia endlicheriana Schauer var. endlicheriana which has egg-shaped to almost round leaves near the flowers and which are 2–4 mm (0.08–0.2 in) long, with sepals 3–3.5 mm (0.12–0.14 in) long, petals 3.5–4 mm (0.1–0.2 in) long, and flowers which are not scented but which turn red as they age;
- Verticordia endlicheriana var. angustifolia A.S.George which is similar to var. endlicheriana except that the leaves near the flowers are linear, 4–8 mm (0.2–0.3 in) long;
- Verticordia endlicheriana var. compacta A.S.George which is similar to var. endlicheriana but the flowers are scented and do not turn red as they age;
- Verticordia endlicheriana var. major A.S.George has longer sepals 3.5–4 mm (0.1–0.2 in) and petals 3.8–4.5 mm (0.1–0.2 in) long than the other varieties;
- Verticordia endlicheriana var. manicula A.S.George which is similar to var. compacta except in its growth habit - it is a much more open shrub.

George placed this species in subgenus Chrysoma, section Chrysoma along with V. citrella, V. subulata and V. acerosa.

== Distribution and habitat ==
This verticordia occurs in a wide range of soils and vegetation associations in the south-west of Western Australia, with each variety having slightly differing requirements.

== Conservation ==
Variety angustifolia is classified as "Priority Three" meaning that it is poorly known and known from only a few locations but is not under imminent threat. The four other varieties are classified as "not threatened".

== Use in horticulture ==
The varieties endlicheriana and angustifolia are well established in gardens but the other varieties have been difficult to propagate and maintain in cultivation.
