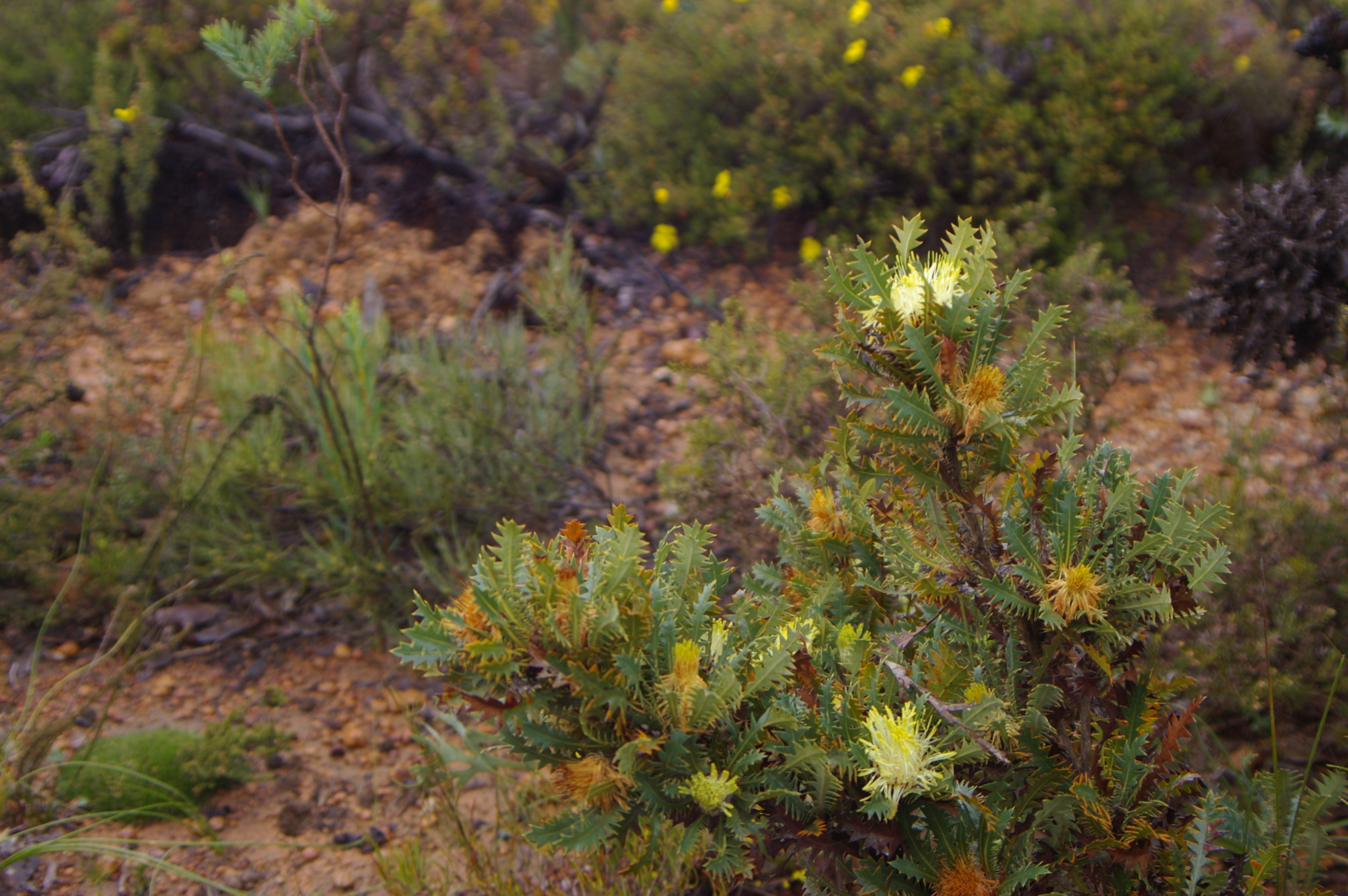
- B. armata var. armata in Beelu National Park

Scientific classification
- Kingdom: Plantae
- Clade: Embryophytes
- Clade: Tracheophytes
- Clade: Spermatophytes
- Clade: Angiosperms
- Clade: Eudicots
- Order: Proteales
- Family: Proteaceae
- Genus: Banksia
- Subgenus: Banksia subg. Banksia
- Series: Banksia ser. Dryandra
- Species: B. armata

Binomial name
- Banksia armata (R.Br.) A.R.Mast & K.R.Thiele

Varieties
- B. armata var. armata; B. armata var. ignicida

Synonyms
- Dryandra armata R.Br.; Josephia armata (R.Br.) Poir.

= Banksia armata =

Prickly dryandra

Species of shrub endemic to Western Australia

Banksia armata, commonly known as prickly dryandra, is a species of flowering plant in the family Proteaceae and is endemic to Western Australia. It is a shrub with deeply serrated leaves with sharply pointed lobes, and spikes of yellow flowers.

== Description ==
Banksia armata grows as a sprawling, spreading or upright shrub that typically grows to a height of 1.5–3 m (4 ft 11 in – 9 ft 10 in) and sometimes forms a lignotuber. It has deeply serrated leaves that are 20–80 mm (0.79–3.15 in) long and 8–25 mm (0.31–0.98 in) wide with five to thirteen sharply pointed, wedge-shaped to narrow egg-shaped lobes on each side. The flowers are arranged in spikes of between 45 and 70, each flower with a yellow, sometimes pink perianth 25–39 mm (0.98–1.54 in) long. Flowering occurs from June to November and the fruit is an egg-shaped follicle 9–10 mm (0.35–0.39 in) long.

== Taxonomy ==
Specimens of B. armata were first collected at King George Sound in December 1801 by Robert Brown. Brown published a description of the species in 1810 in Transactions of the Linnean Society of London naming it Dryandra armata. The specific epithet is from the Latin armatus meaning "armed", in reference to the sharply serrated leaves. Thirty years later, John Lindley published a purported new species, which he named Dryandra favosa. This was accepted as a species by Carl Meissner in 1845, but declared a taxonomic synonym of D. armata by him in 1856, and the latter view was taken by George Bentham his 1870 Flora Australiensis. In 1996, Alex George published D. a. var. ignicida, resulting in the automatic creation of the autonym D. a. var.armata. George also refined the synonymy of D. favosa to D. armata var. armata. In 2007, all Dryandra species were transferred to Banksia by Austin Mast and Kevin Thiele so that the name D. armata changed to Banksia armata.

The names of the two varieties of this species are accepted by the Australian Plant Census:

- Banksia armata (R.Br.) A.R.Mast & K.R.Thiele var. armata, a shrub to 1–1.5 m (3 ft 3 in – 4 ft 11 in) high with a lignotuber and with leaves 8–20 mm (0.31–0.79 in) wide with six to thirteen lobes on each side;
- Banksia armata var. ignicida (A.S.George) A.R.Mast & K.R.Thiele, a shrub to 3 m (9.8 ft), lacking a lignotuber and with leaves 20–25 mm (0.79–0.98 in) wide with five to eight lobes on each side.

== Distribution and habitat ==
The species is widespread throughout most of the south-west. The main distribution is between Perth and Albany, but it also occurs near Mount Lesueur in the north, and between Esperance and Israelite Bay on the south coast. It grows on sandy loam or in rocky soils in tall shrubland or low woodland.

== Conservation status ==
Banksia armata and both varieties are classified as "not threatened" by the Western Australian Government Department of Parks and Wildlife.
