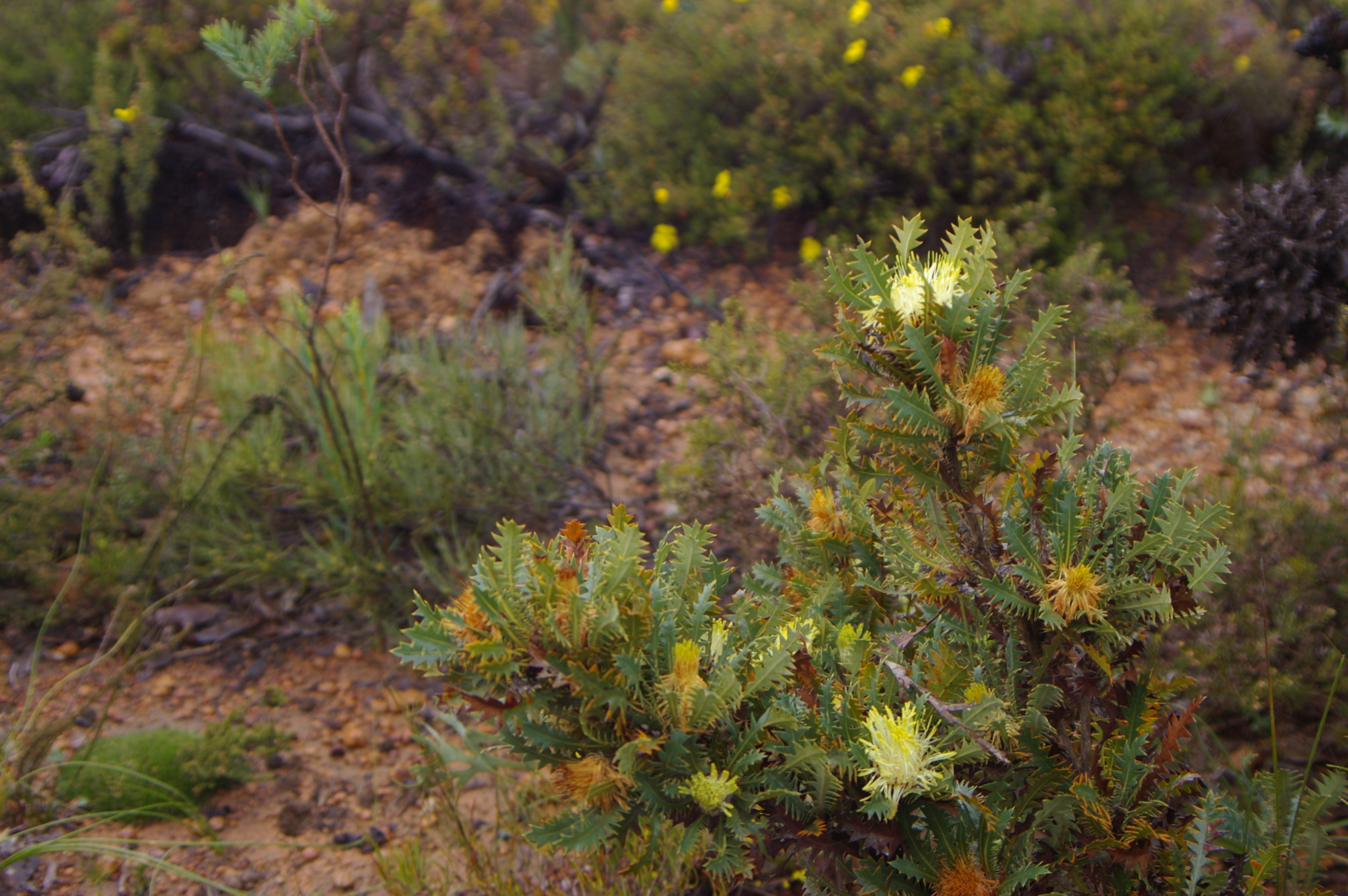
- Habit in the Beelu National Park

Scientific classification
- Kingdom: Plantae
- Clade: Tracheophytes
- Clade: Angiosperms
- Clade: Eudicots
- Order: Proteales
- Family: Proteaceae
- Genus: Banksia
- Species: B. armata (R.Br.) A.R.Mast & K.R.Thiele
- Variety: B. a. var. armata

Trinomial name
- Banksia armata var. armata

Synonyms
- Dryandra armata R.Br. var. armata; Dryandra favosa Lindl.; Dryandra gilbertii S.Moore

= Banksia armata var. armata =

Variety of shrub endemic to Western Australia

Banksia armata var. armata is a variety of shrub that is endemic to Western Australia. It differs from the other variety (Banksia armata var. ignicida) in having a lignotuber, narrower leaves with more side lobes and shorter flowers. It is also usually a shorter plant.

== Description ==
Banksia armata var. armata is a shrub that typically grows to a height of 1.5 m (4 ft 11 in) and forms a lignotuber. It has leaves that are 20–80 mm (0.79–3.15 in) long and 8–20 mm (0.31–0.79 in) wide and deeply serrated with between six and thirteen triangular, sharply pointed lobes on each side. The perianth is yellow, 25–32 mm (0.98–1.26 in) long and the pistil 28–39 mm (1.1–1.5 in) long.

== Taxonomy and naming ==
Specimens of B. armata were first collected at King George Sound in December 1801 by Robert Brown. Brown published a description of the species in 1810, naming it Dryandra armata in the Transactions of the Linnean Society of London. The specific epithet (armata) is from the Latin armatus meaning "armed", in reference to the sharply serrated leaves.

Thirty years later, John Lindley published a purported new species, which he named Dryandra favosa, published in A Sketch of the Vegetation of the Swan River Colony. Dryandra favosa was accepted as a species by Carl Meissner in 1845, but declared a taxonomic synonym of D. armata by him in 1856. The latter view was taken by George Bentham his 1870 Flora Australiensis.

In 1996, Alex George published Dryandra armata var. ignicida, thereby invoking the autonym D. armata var. armata. George also refined the synonymy of D. favosa to this subspecies. In 2007, all Dryandra species were transferred to Banksia by Austin Mast and Kevin Thiele and the change is accepted by the Australian Plant Census.

== Distribution and habitat ==
This variety is widespread in the south-west, mainly between Mount Lesueur, Walpole and the Cape Arid National Park. It grows amongst open woodland and kwongan, usually on rocky soils.

== Conservation status ==
This variety of B. armata is classified as "not threatened" by the Western Australian Government Department of Parks and Wildlife.
