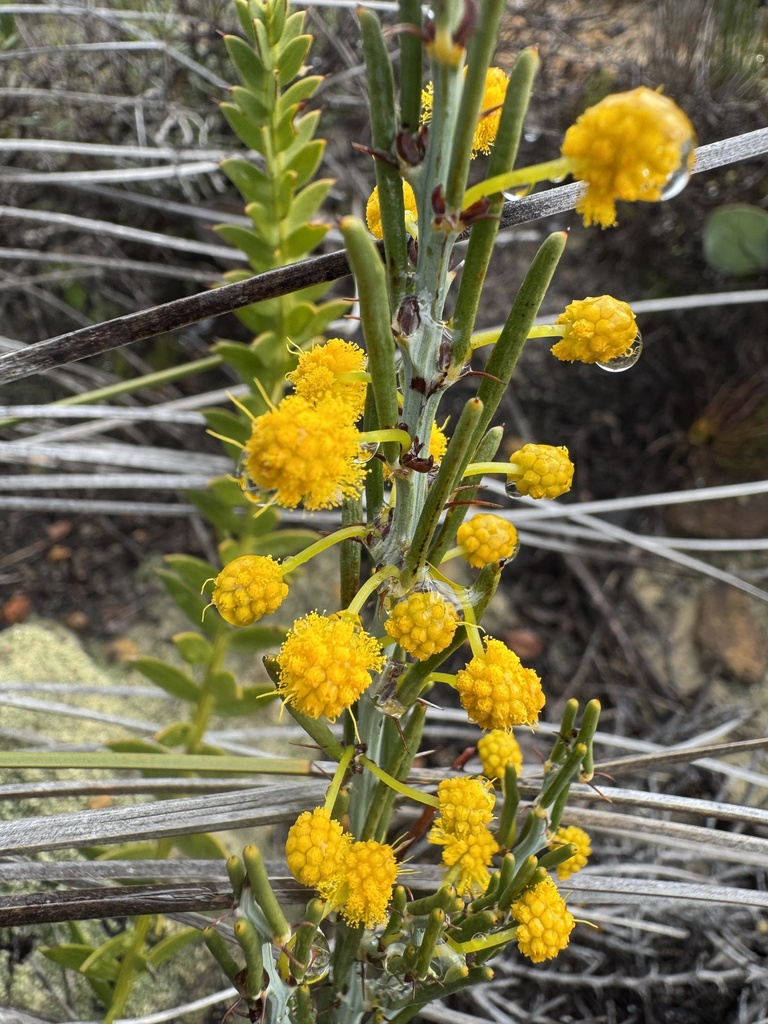
- In Lesueur National Park

Scientific classification
- Kingdom: Plantae
- Clade: Embryophytes
- Clade: Tracheophytes
- Clade: Spermatophytes
- Clade: Angiosperms
- Clade: Eudicots
- Clade: Rosids
- Order: Fabales
- Family: Fabaceae
- Subfamily: Caesalpinioideae
- Clade: Mimosoid clade
- Genus: Acacia
- Species: A. teretifolia

Binomial name
- Acacia teretifolia Benth.
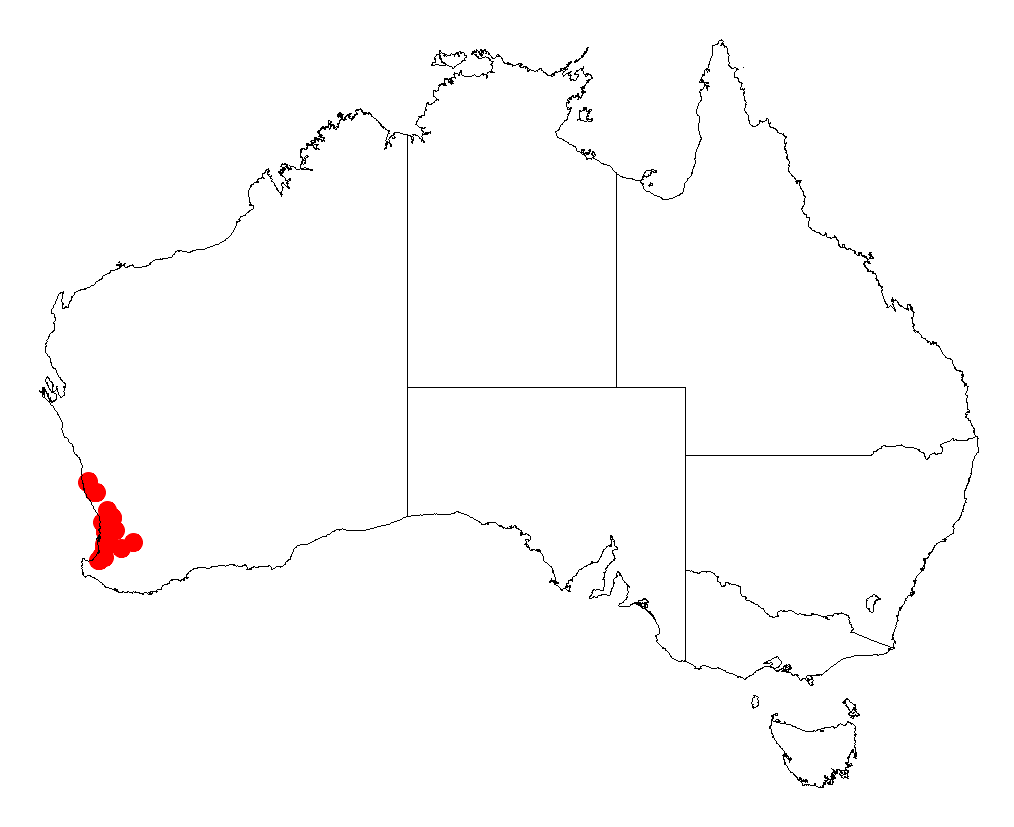
- Occurrence data from AVH

= Acacia teretifolia =

Species of legume

Acacia teretifolia is a shrub of the genus Acacia and the subgenus Phyllodineae. It is native to an area in the Wheatbelt, South West and Peel regions of Western Australia.

== Description ==
The pungent sub-shrub is typically 0.2 to 0.5 m (7.9 in to 1 ft 7.7 in) in height with an open and erect habit and has multiple glabrous stems with finely-ribbed flexuose branchlets that have spiny slender stipules that are 1.5 to 4 mm (0.059 to 0.157 in) long. It has green to grey green, erect, cylindrical to occasionally flat phyllodes that are 8 to 27 mm (0.31 to 1.06 in) in length and 0.7 to 1.5 mm (0.028 to 0.059 in) wide with four to five obscure nerves. It blooms between May and July forming simple inflorescences form singly or in pairs and have spherical flower-heads that contain 23 to 30 bright light golden coloured flowers. The sub-woody, red-brown, cylindrical and shallowly curved seed pods that form later are narrowed at both ends and are up to 10 cm (3.9 in) in length and 3 to 3.5 mm (0.12 to 0.14 in) wide. The dull yellow-brown seeds inside have a narrowly oblong shape and are arranged longitudinally inside the pod.

== Taxonomy ==
The species was first formally described by the botanist George Bentham in 1842 as a part of the work Notes on Mimoseae, with a synopsis of species. as published in William Jackson Hooker's London Journal of Botany. The only synonym is Racosperma teretifolium as described by Leslie Pedley in 2003 before it was returned to genus Acacia in 2006. The type specimen was collected by James Drummond from around the Swan River.

== Distribution ==
It has a discontinuous distribution from around Lesueur National Park in the north down to around Donnybrook in the south. It is usually found growing in sandy to sandy-clay soils over granite or laterite.

== See also ==
- List of Acacia species
