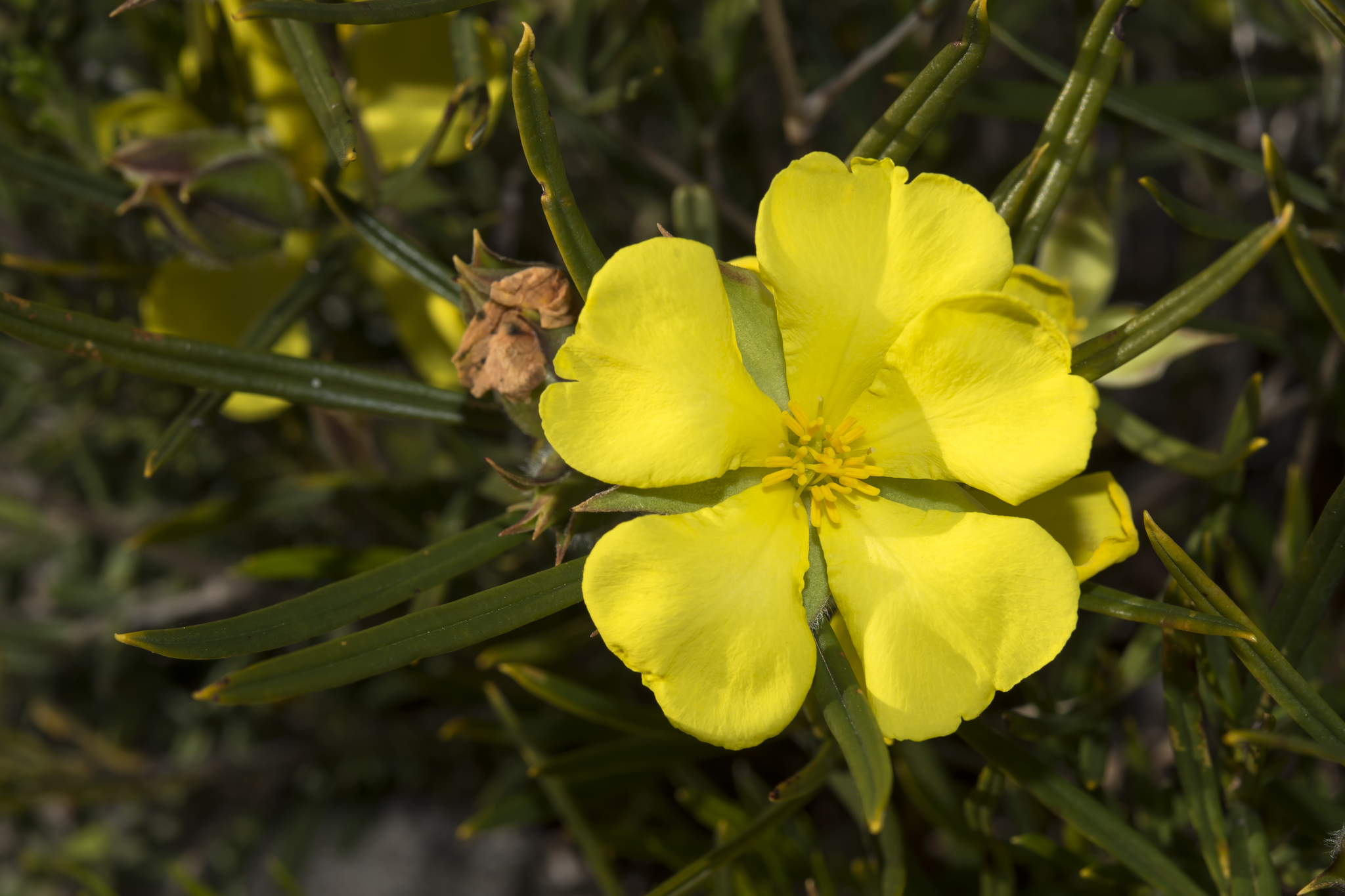
- Near Lesueur National Park

Scientific classification
- Kingdom: Plantae
- Clade: Embryophytes
- Clade: Tracheophytes
- Clade: Spermatophytes
- Clade: Angiosperms
- Clade: Eudicots
- Order: Dilleniales
- Family: Dilleniaceae
- Genus: Hibbertia
- Species: H. striata

Binomial name
- Hibbertia striata (Steud.) K.R.Thiele

= Hibbertia striata =

Species of flowering plant

Hibbertia striata is a species of flowering plant in the family Dilleniaceae and is endemic to the southwest of Western Australia. It is a spreading shrub with linear leaves and yellow flowers usually with thirty stamens arranged in five bundles around five glabrous carpels.

== Description ==
Hibbertia striata is a spreading shrub that typically grows to a height of 20–50 cm (7.9–19.7 in), its branchlets sometimes covered with pale grey hairs. The leaves are linear, mostly 30–60 mm (1.2–2.4 in) long and 1–2 mm (0.039–0.079 in) wide with the edges rolled under, obscuring the lower surface apart from the midrib. The flowers are arranged singly on the ends of the branches and short side shoots and are sessile with narrowly egg-shaped bracts 6–15 mm (0.24–0.59 in) long at the base. The five sepals are egg-shaped, mostly 12–18 mm (0.47–0.71 in) long and covered with white hairs. The five petals are yellow, 12–15 mm (0.47–0.59 in) long and egg-shaped with the narrower end towards the base and there are about thirty stamens arranged around five glabrous carpels, each carpel with a single ovule. Flowering mainly occurs from July to November.

== Taxonomy ==
This species was first formally described in 1845 by Ernst Gottlieb von Steudel who gave it the name Candollea striata in Lehmann's Plantae Preissianae. In 2017, Kevin Thiele changed the name to Hibbertia striata in the journal Nuytsia. The specific epithet (striata) refers to the leaves.

== Distribution and habitat ==
Hibbertia striata grows in woodland and forest and is widespread, mostly in the area between Morawa, Mingenew, Wongan Hills, York and Brookton in the Avon Wheatbelt, Geraldton Sandplains, Jarrah Forest and Swan Coastal Plain biogeographic regions of south-western Western Australia.

== Conservation status ==
Hibbertia striata is classified as "not threatened" by the Government of Western Australia Department of Biodiversity, Conservation and Attractions.

== See also ==
- List of Hibbertia species
