= Eucalyptus angularis =

Lesueur phantom mallee

Conservation status
- Data Deficient (IUCN 3.1)

- Priority Two — Poorly Known Taxa (DEC)

Scientific classification
- Kingdom: Plantae
- Clade: Tracheophytes
- Clade: Angiosperms
- Clade: Eudicots
- Clade: Rosids
- Order: Myrtales
- Family: Myrtaceae
- Genus: Eucalyptus
- Species: E. angularis

Binomial name
- Eucalyptus angularis Brooker & Hopper

Species of eucalyptus

Eucalyptus angularis, commonly known as Lesueur phantom mallee, is a rare species of mallee that is endemic to the south-west of Western Australia. It has rough bark at the base of the stems, smooth greyish bark above, lance-shaped adult leaves and flower buds in groups of about eleven, but the characteristics of the flowers and fruit have not been recorded.

== Description ==
Eucalyptus angularis is a mallee that typically grows to a height of 3 m (9.8 ft). It has grey rough or flaky bark at the base of the stems, and smooth grey bark above. The branchlets are angular and the adult leaves are glossy green, lance-shaped or curved, 55–100 mm (2.2–3.9 in) long and 15–17 mm (0.59–0.67 in) wide on a petiole 10–18 mm (0.39–0.71 in) long. The flower buds are borne in groups of about eleven on an unbranched peduncle 10–12 mm (0.39–0.47 in) long. The mature buds, flowers and fruit have not been recorded.

== Taxonomy ==
Eucalyptus angularis was first formally described by the botanists Ian Brooker and Stephen Hopper in 1993 in the journal Nuytsia from material they collected on Mount Benia in 1983. The specific epithet (angularis) means "angled", referring to the branchlets.

== Distribution ==
Lesueur phantom mallee is only known from two small stands on lateritic breakaways near Mount Lesueur and the type location in the Wheatbelt region in the south-west of Western Australia.

== Conservation status ==
This mallee eucalypt is classified as "Priority Two" by the Western Australian Government Department of Parks and Wildlife meaning that it is poorly known and from only one or a few locations.

== See also ==
- List of Eucalyptus species
