= Verticordia endlicheriana var. major =

Scientific classification
- Kingdom: Plantae
- Clade: Tracheophytes
- Clade: Angiosperms
- Clade: Eudicots
- Clade: Rosids
- Order: Myrtales
- Family: Myrtaceae
- Genus: Verticordia
- Species: V. endlicheriana
- Variety: V. e. var. major

Trinomial name
- Verticordia endlicheriana var. major A.S.George

Variety of flowering plant

Verticordia endlicheriana var. major is a flowering plant in the myrtle family, Myrtaceae and is endemic to the south-west of Western Australia. It is a small, compact shrub with lightly-scented, lemon-yellow flowers which do not change colour as they age.

== Description ==
Verticordia endlicheriana var. major is a compact, rigid shrub which grows to a height of 20–60 cm (8–20 in) and a width of 10–40 cm (4–20 in), with one to several main stems at the base. The leaves on the stems are linear in shape and 4–8 mm (0.2–0.3 in) long while those near the leaves are egg-shaped to almost round and 2–4 mm (0.08–0.2 in) long.

The flowers are lightly-scented and arranged in round or corymb-like groups on erect stalks from 5–12 mm (0.2–0.5 in) long. The floral cup is broad top-shaped, 0.6–0.8 mm (0.02–0.03 in) long, ribbed and glabrous. The sepals are lemon-yellow, 3.5–4.0 mm (0.14–0.16 in) long, with 6 to 8 hairy lobes and do not change colour as they age. The petals are a similar colour to the sepals, 3.5–4 mm (0.1–0.2 in), their main body is 1.3–1.5 mm (0.05–0.06 in) long and they have long, pointed, finger-like appendages. The style is 1.5–2.5 mm (0.06–0.1 in) long, straight and glabrous. Flowering occurs from September to December.

== Taxonomy and naming ==
Verticordia endlicheriana was first formally described by Johannes Conrad Schauer in 1844 and the description was published in Lehmann's Plantae Preissianae. In 1991, Alex George undertook a review of the genus Verticordia and described five varieties of Verticordia endlicheriana including this variety. The varietal name "major" refers to the flowers of this variety which are larger than those in the rest of the species.

== Distribution and habitat ==
This variety grows in sand and gravel, as well as gravelly loam, often with Verticordia subulata, in heath. It occurs between the areas of Pingrup, the Green Range and the Hamersley River in the Esperance Plains and Mallee biogeographic regions.

== Conservation ==
Verticordia endlicheriana var. major is classified as "not threatened" by the Western Australian Government Department of Parks and Wildlife.

== Use in horticulture ==
The compact, robust habit, late flowering and unfading flower colour indicate the horticultural potential of this variety but to date, few attempts to propagate or grow it in gardens have been made.
