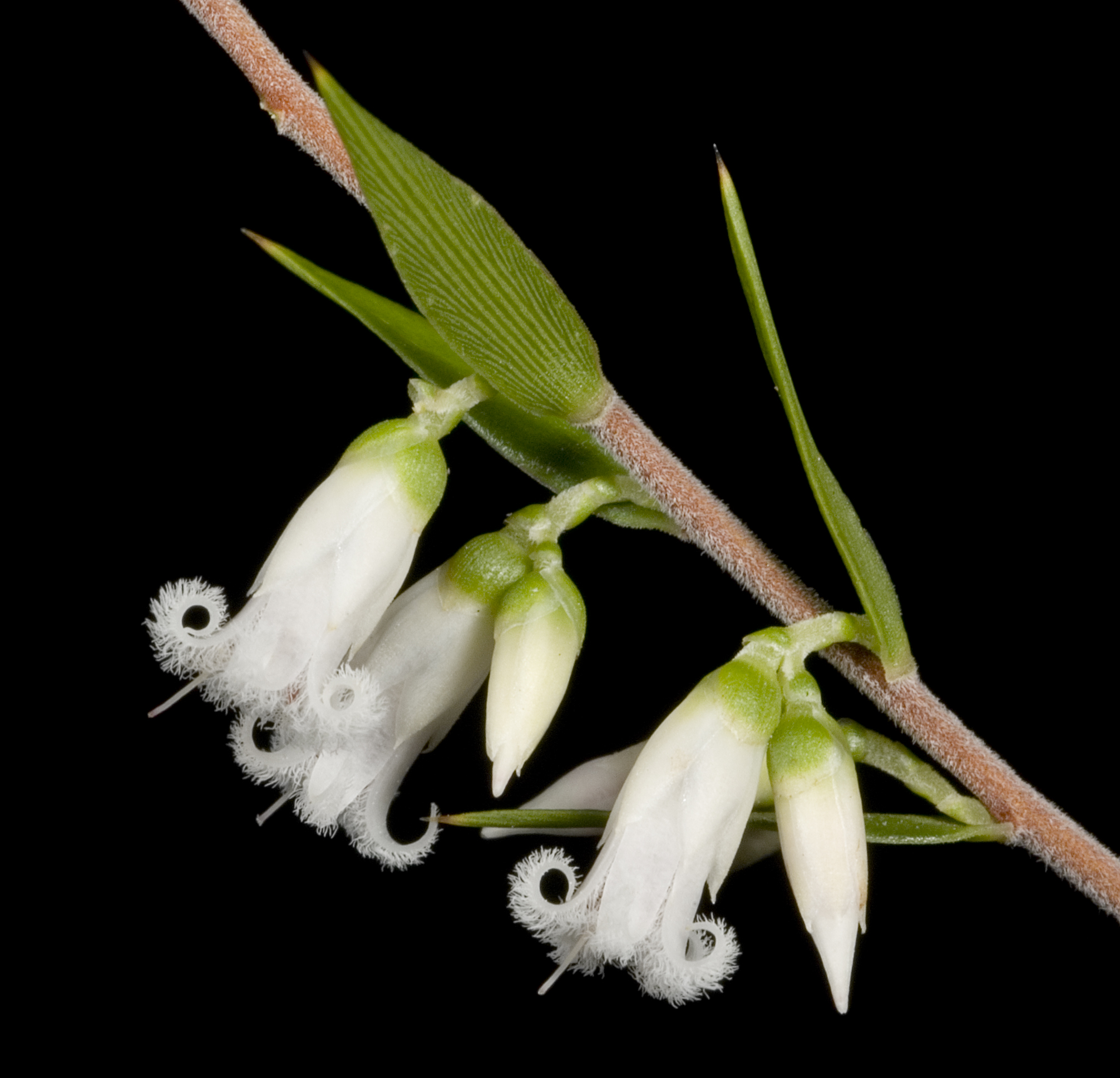

Scientific classification
- Kingdom: Plantae
- Clade: Tracheophytes
- Clade: Angiosperms
- Clade: Eudicots
- Clade: Asterids
- Order: Ericales
- Family: Ericaceae
- Genus: Styphelia
- Species: S. conostephioides

Binomial name
- Styphelia conostephioides (DC.) F.Muell.

Synonyms
- Leucopogon conostephioides DC.

= Styphelia conostephioides =

Species of flowering plant

Styphelia conostephioides is a flowering plant in the family Ericaceae and is endemic to the south-west of Western Australia. It is an erect, straggling shrub with lance-shaped leaves with a sharp point on the tip, and white flowers arranged in pairs in leaf axils.

== Description ==
Styphelia conostephioides is an erect, straggling shrub that typically grows up to about 30 cm (12 in) high and wide, its young branchlets sometimes softly-hairy. The leaves are directed upwards or spreading, lance-shaped, 6–13 mm (0.24–0.51 in) long, tapering to a sharp, rigid point on the tip and finely striated. The flowers are arranged in singly, in pairs or groups of three in leaf axils, on a short, spreading or down-turned peduncle. There are minute bracts and bracteoles about one-third as long as the sepals at the base. The sepals are dry and smooth, 3.2 mm (0.13 in) long and the petals white and 6.5 mm (0.26 in) long with lobes the same length as the tube.

== Taxonomy ==
This species was first described in 1839 by Augustin Pyramus de Candolle who gave it the name Leucopogon conostephioides in his Prodromus Systematis Naturalis Regni Vegetabilis from specimens collected by James Drummond near the Swan River Colony. In 1867 Ferdinand von Mueller transferred it to the genus Styphelia as S. conostephioides in his Fragmenta Phytographiae Australiae.

== Distribution ==
Styphelia conostephioides is found from near Lesueur National Park to Dunsborough and inland to Boyup Brook in the Geraldton Sandplains, Jarrah Forest, Mallee and Swan Coastal Plain bioregions of south-western Western Australia.
