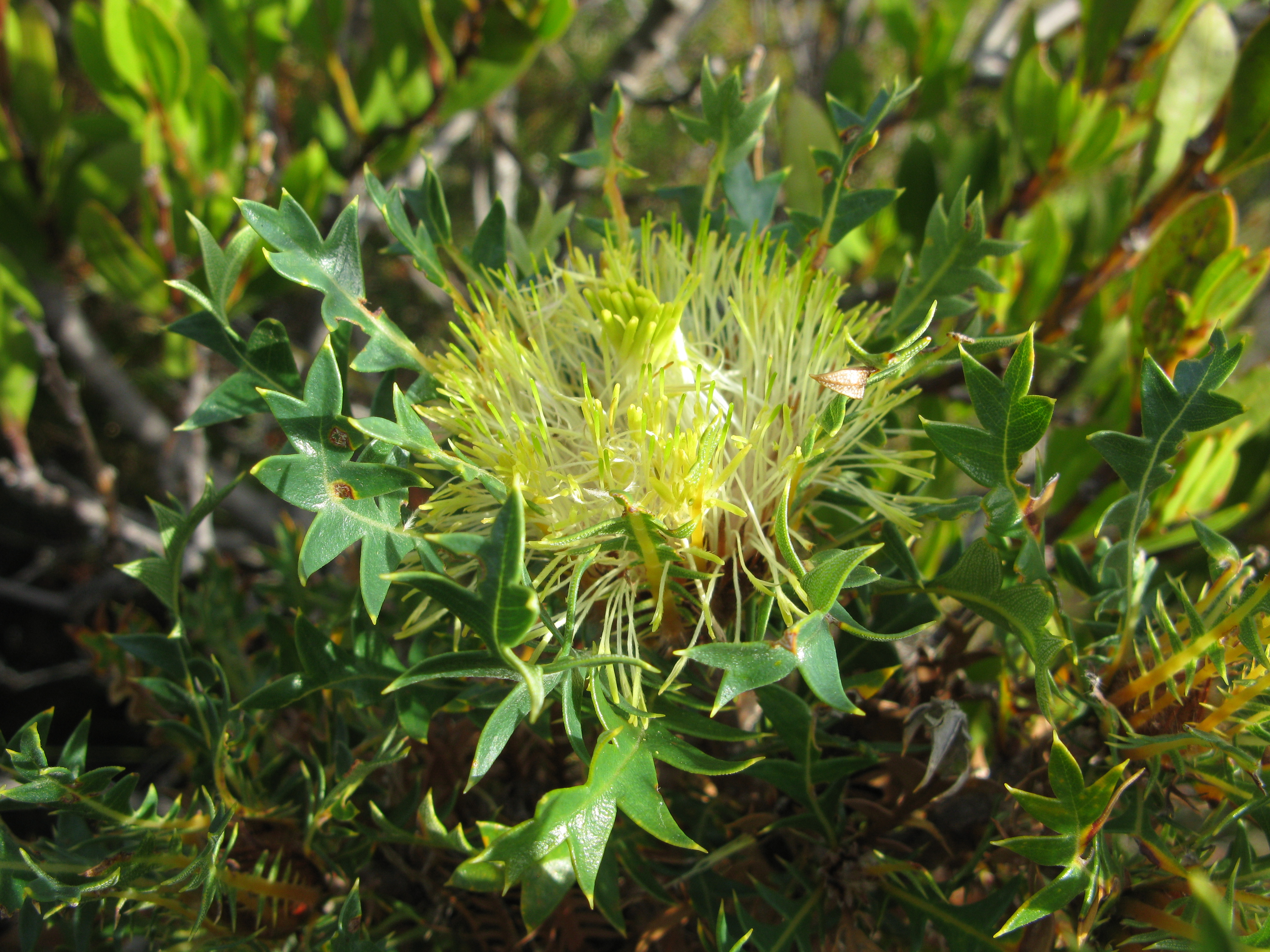
- Variety ignicida in Cape Le Grand National Park

Scientific classification
- Kingdom: Plantae
- Clade: Tracheophytes
- Clade: Angiosperms
- Clade: Eudicots
- Order: Proteales
- Family: Proteaceae
- Genus: Banksia
- Species: B. armata
- Variety: B. a. var. ignicida

Trinomial name
- Banksia armata var. ignicida (A.S.George) A.R.Mast & K.R.Thiele

= Banksia armata var. ignicida =

Variety of shrub endemic to Western Australia

Banksia armata var. ignicida is a variety of shrub that is endemic to Western Australia. It differs from the autonym (Banksia armata var. armata) in not having a lignotuber. It is also usually a taller plant with leaves that are longer with fewer side lobes, and longer flowers.

== Description ==
Banksia armata var. ignicida is a shrub that typically grows to a height of up to 3 m (9.8 ft) and lacks a lignotuber. It has leaves that are 60–80 mm (2.4–3.1 in) long and 20–25 mm (0.79–0.98 in) wide and deeply serrated with between five and eight triangular, sharply pointed lobes on each side. The perianth is yellow, 30–39 mm (1.2–1.5 in) long and the pistil 35–42 mm (1.4–1.7 in) long.

== Taxonomy ==
Specimens of B. armata were first collected in 1801, and the description was published in 1810 in the Transactions of the Linnean Society of London by Robert Brown as Dryandra armata. In 1996, Alex George described two varieties of D. armata in the journal Nuytsia. The type specimens of D. armata var. ignicida were collected by him east of Woodanilling. The varietal epithet (ignicida) is from the Latin ignis ("fire") and -cidus ("killing"), in reference to the fact that this variety is killed by fire (because it lacks a lignotuber). In 2007, all Dryandra species were transferred to Banksia by Austin Mast and Kevin Thiele and the change is accepted by the Australian Plant Census.

== Distribution and habitat ==
This variety occurs through much of the south-west of Western Australia, being widespread between Pingelly and Katanning, and east to Mount Ragged in the Cape Arid National Park.
