= Hakea megalosperma =

Conservation status
- Declared rare (DEC)

Scientific classification
- Kingdom: Plantae
- Clade: Tracheophytes
- Clade: Angiosperms
- Clade: Eudicots
- Order: Proteales
- Family: Proteaceae
- Genus: Hakea
- Species: H. megalosperma

Binomial name
- Hakea megalosperma Meisn.
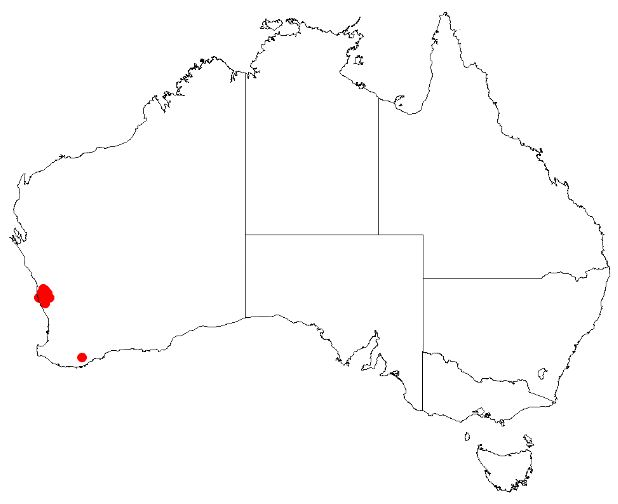
- Occurrence data from AVH

Species of shrub endemic to Western Australia

Hakea megalosperma, commonly known as Lesueur hakea, is a shrub of the genus Hakea native to a small area along the west coast in the Wheatbelt region of Western Australia. It is a small shrub with sweetly fragrant white or pink flowers, darkening as they age to red and thick egg-shaped bluish-green leaves.

== Description ==
Hakea megalosperma is a low spreading shrub that typically grows to a height of 1 to 2 metres (3 to 7 ft) and up to 2 m (6 ft 7 in) wide and does not form a lignotuber. The leaves are bluish-green, egg-shaped or narrowly obovate, tapering to the base, 3.7–8.2 cm (1.5–3.2 in) long and 11–27 mm (0.43–1.06 in) wide with a rounded apex ending with a point 0.1 mm (0.0039 in) long. The leaves have a mid-vein, smooth margin and end sometimes with a curling apex. The inflorescence consists of white-cream or pink strongly scented flowers, darkening to red as they age on smooth stem 2–3 mm (0.079–0.118 in) long. The smooth pedicels are 3.5–4.5 mm (0.14–0.18 in) long, perianth 3–4 mm (0.12–0.16 in) long and smooth, the pistil 7–8.5 mm (0.28–0.33 in) long. The large fruit are elliptical to egg-shaped 7–8.5 cm (2.8–3.3 in) long, 3.5–4 cm (1.4–1.6 in) wide with darker small blister like protuberances on the surface and ending with two pointed horns 8–10 mm (0.31–0.39 in) long. Flowering occurs from May to June.

== Taxonomy and naming ==
Hakea megalosperma was first formally described by Carl Meisner in 1855 and the description was published in Hooker's Journal of Botany and Kew Garden Miscellany. The specific epithet megalosperma is derived from the Greek "referring to the large seeds".

== Distribution and habitat ==
Lesueur hakea is a rare and endangered species growing on lateritic sand plains in low heathland from Jurien Bay to Mount Lesueur Western Australia.
