= Verticordia sect. Chrysoma =

Scientific classification
- Kingdom: Plantae
- Clade: Tracheophytes
- Clade: Angiosperms
- Clade: Eudicots
- Clade: Rosids
- Order: Myrtales
- Family: Myrtaceae
- Genus: Verticordia
- Subgenus: Verticordia subg. Chrysoma
- Section: Verticordia sect. Chrysoma

Type species
- Verticordia acerosa

Species
- 4 species: see text.

Group of flowering plants

Verticordia sect. Chrysoma is one of seven sections in the subgenus Chrysoma. It includes four species of plants in the genus Verticordia. Plants in this section are small shrubs with small, bright yellow flowers which usually turn red as they age. They have sepals with fringed lobes and petals which have lobes arranged like the fingers of a hand. The subgenus Chrysoma was originally described in 1843 by Johannes Conrad Schauer and the description was published in Monographia Myrtacearum Xerocarpicarum. When Alex George reviewed the genus in 1991, he took the name of this section from that of the subgenus.

The type species for this section is Verticordia acerosa and the other three species are V. citrella, V. subulata and V. endlicheriana.
