= Verticordia endlicheriana var. angustifolia =

Conservation status
- Priority Three — Poorly Known Taxa (DEC)

Scientific classification
- Kingdom: Plantae
- Clade: Tracheophytes
- Clade: Angiosperms
- Clade: Eudicots
- Clade: Rosids
- Order: Myrtales
- Family: Myrtaceae
- Genus: Verticordia
- Species: V. endlicheriana
- Variety: V. e. var. angustifolia

Trinomial name
- Verticordia endlicheriana var. angustifolia A.S.George

Variety of flowering plant

Verticordia endlicheriana var. angustifolia is a flowering plant in the myrtle family, Myrtaceae and is endemic to the south-west of Western Australia. It is a small, upright shrub with narrow leaves and sweetly-perfumed, golden-yellow flowers which do not change colour as they age.

== Description ==
Verticordia endlicheriana var. angustifolia is an upright shrub which grows to a height of 20–50 cm (8–20 in) and a width of 10–50 cm (4–20 in), with one to several main stems at the base. Both the leaves on the stems and those near the flowers are linear in shape and 4–8 mm (0.2–0.3 in) long.

The flowers are sweetly-scented and arranged in round or corymb-like groups on erect stalks from 5–12 mm (0.2–0.5 in) long. The floral cup is broad, top-shaped, 0.9–1.3 mm (0.04–0.05 in) long, ribbed and glabrous. The sepals are golden-yellow, do not change colour with age and are 3–3.5 mm (0.12–0.14 in) long, with 6 to 8 hairy lobes. The petals are a similar colour to the sepals, 2.5–4.0 mm (0.1–0.2 in) long and have long, pointed, finger-like appendages. The style is 1.5–2.5 mm (0.06–0.1 in) long, straight and glabrous. Flowering occurs from August to November.

== Taxonomy and naming ==
Verticordia endlicheriana was first formally described by Johannes Conrad Schauer in 1844 and the description was published in Lehmann's Plantae Preissianae. In 1991, Alex George undertook a review of the genus Verticordia and described five varieties of Verticordia endlicheriana including this variety. The epithet "angustifolia" is from the Latin word meaning "narrow-leaved" referring to the leaves near the flowers, compared to those of the other varieties of this species.

== Distribution and habitat ==
This variety grows in rocky crevices between granite boulders in heath near Mount Barker, Mount Roe and Mount Lindesay in the Jarrah Forest biogeographic region.

== Conservation ==
Verticordia endlicheriana var. angustifolia is classified as "Priority Three" by the Western Australian Government Department of Parks and Wildlife meaning that it is poorly known and known from only a few locations but is not under imminent threat.

== Use in horticulture ==
The pine-like foliage and brightly coloured perfumed flowers of this variety have encouraged attempts to cultivate it and some specimens have grown in gardens for up to 4 years. It is usually propagated from cuttings although these are sometimes slow to develop into established plants. Those in sand or sandy gravel do the best but suffer in extreme heat.
