= Lesueur National Park =

National park in Western Australia

- IUCN category II (national park)
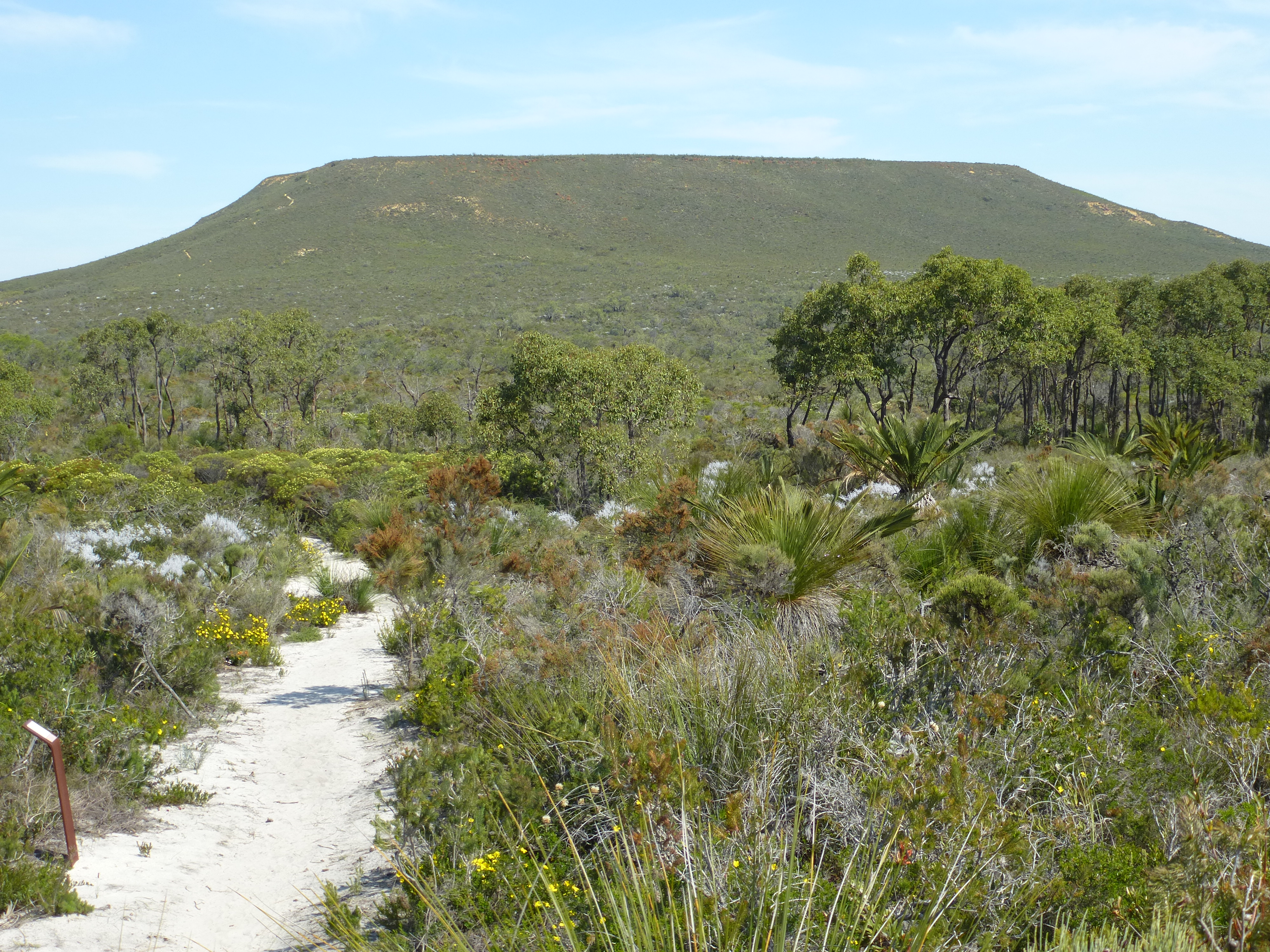
- Mount Lesueur

- Location within Western Australia
- Location: Western Australia
- Nearest city: Jurien Bay
- Coordinates: 30°08′04″S 115°06′02″E
- Area: 272.35 km^{2} (105.15 sq mi)
- Established: 1992
- Governing body: Department of Environment and Conservation
- Website: parks.dpaw.wa.gov.au/park/lesueur

Lesueur National Park is a national park straddling the boundary between the Wheatbelt and Mid West regions of Western Australia, 211 km north of Perth. The park was gazetted in 1992. It includes two mesas known as Mount Lesueur and Mount Michaud, and supports a highly diverse flora.

== Flora ==
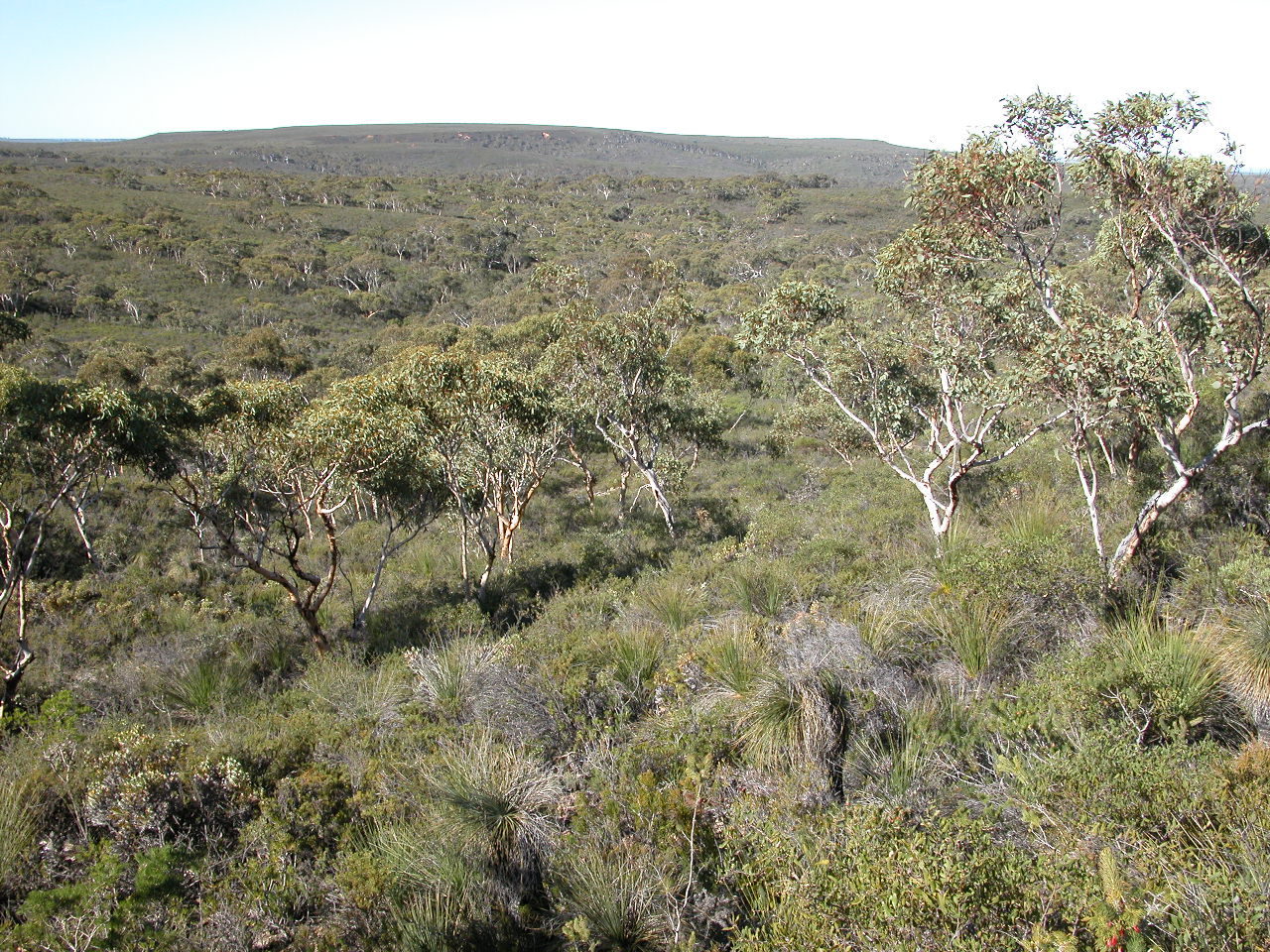
Open Eucalyptus woodland with a diverse understorey

Lesueur National Park lies in the Geraldton Sandplains bioregion, which is characterised by scrubby heath with a high number of plants from the family Proteaceae.

Vegetation in the park is structurally complex, with patches of woodland amongst shrublands.

There are over 900 indigenous plant species in the park, many of which are endemic. Rare or threatened species include the Mount Lesueur Grevillea, Forrest's Wattle, the Lesueur Hakea and the Laterite Mallee.

The park is the northern limit for jarrah and mountain marri, both of which grow as mallees instead of the more usual tall tree form.

Lesueur National Park is under threat from the effects of Phytophthora dieback, a disease which kills plants and is spread through movement of infected soil or water.

== 1980s coal mining and power station proposals ==
In the 1980s, due to appraisals of coal deposits in the area, the Mount Lesueur and Hill River areas were in controversy over proposed coal mining and power station development, until the creation of the National Park in 1990.

== See also ==
- Protected areas of Western Australia
