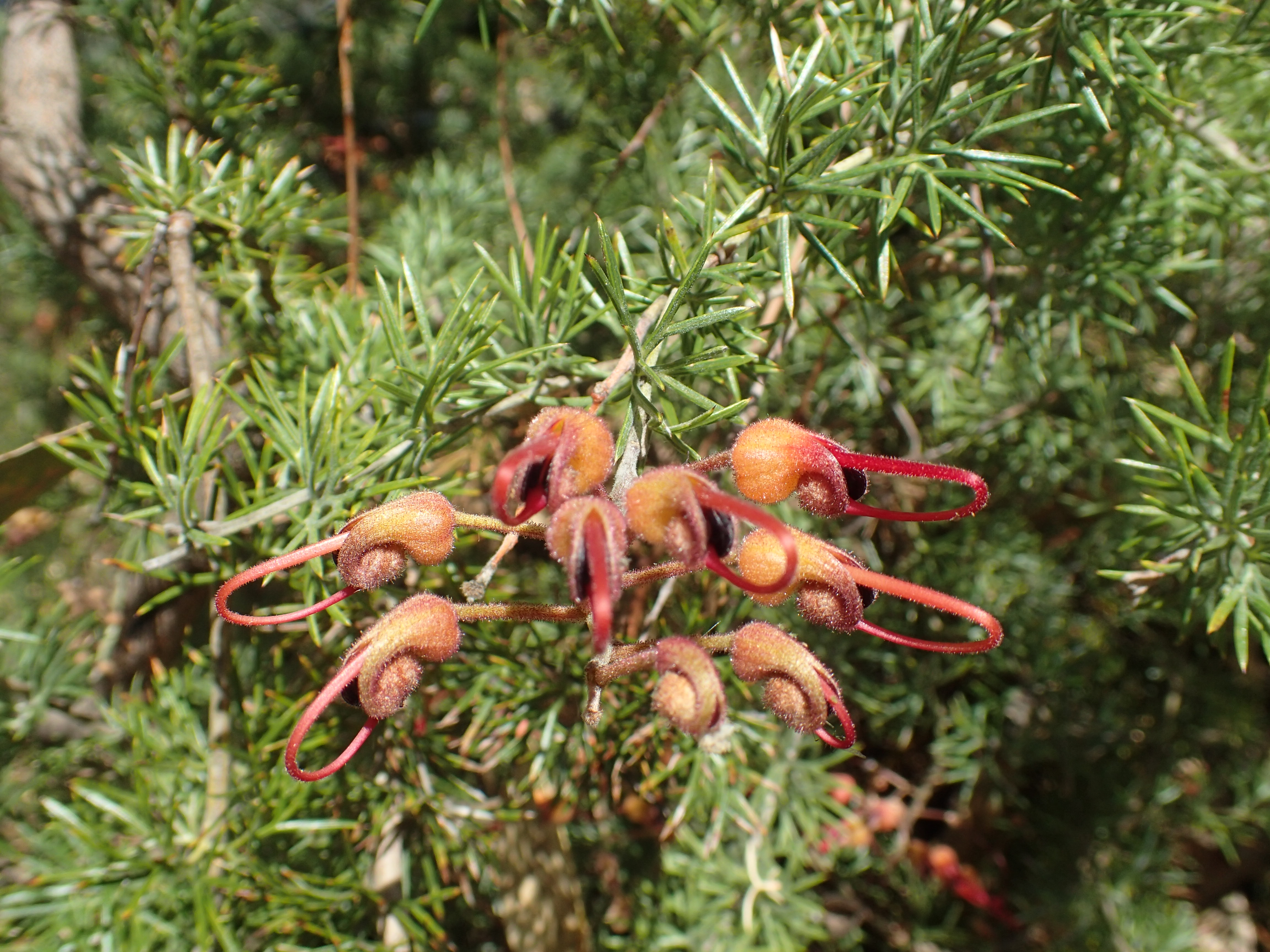
- Grevillea batrachioides in Kings Park

Conservation status
- Declared rare (DEC)

- Endangered (EPBC Act)

Scientific classification
- Kingdom: Plantae
- Clade: Embryophytes
- Clade: Tracheophytes
- Clade: Spermatophytes
- Clade: Angiosperms
- Clade: Eudicots
- Order: Proteales
- Family: Proteaceae
- Genus: Grevillea
- Species: G. batrachioides

Binomial name
- Grevillea batrachioides McGill. ex F.Muell.

= Grevillea batrachioides =

Mt Lesueur grevillea

Species of shrub endemic to Western Australia

Grevillea batrachioides, commonly known as Mount Lesueur grevillea, is a shrub which is endemic to a small area along the west coast in the Mid West region of Western Australia.

== Description ==
Grevillea batrachioides is a shrub which typically grows to a height of 0.5 to 2 metres (2 to 7 ft) and has glaucous branchlets. It has pinnate leaves that are 10 to 40 millimetres (0.39 to 1.57 in) long, 1 to 1.2 mm (0.039 to 0.047 in) wide with their edges rolled under. Irregularly shaped pink inflorescence located on a raceme at the end of the branchlets from October to December. A simple brown hairy ellipsoidal, ribbed fruit follows.

== Taxonomy and naming ==
Mount Lesueur grevillea was first formally described in 1986 by D.J. Mc Gillivray from an unpublished description by Ferdinand von Mueller. The specific epithet (batrachioides) is derived from the Ancient Greek word batrachos meaning "frog" with the ending oides meaning "likeness" referring to a similarity of this plant to those in the subgenus Batrachium of Ranunculus known as "water buttercup".

== Conservation status ==
G. batrachioides is listed as endangered under the Environment Protection and Biodiversity Conservation Act 1999 and critically endangered under the Biodiversity Conservation Act 2016 in Western Australia. Although it has not yet been assessed by the IUCN, it meets Red List category critically endangered under criterion D. Only one population exists numbering 45 adult plants and 13 juveniles in a survey conducted in 2002. The main threats to the species are inappropriate fire regimes, disease such as dieback from the pathogen Phytophthora cinnamomi and disturbance from recreational activities.

== See also ==
- List of Grevillea species
