= Verticordia endlicheriana var. compacta =

Scientific classification
- Kingdom: Plantae
- Clade: Tracheophytes
- Clade: Angiosperms
- Clade: Eudicots
- Clade: Rosids
- Order: Myrtales
- Family: Myrtaceae
- Genus: Verticordia
- Species: V. endlicheriana
- Variety: V. e. var. compacta

Trinomial name
- Verticordia endlicheriana var. compacta A.S.George

Variety of flowering plant

Verticordia endlicheriana var. compacta is a flowering plant in the myrtle family, Myrtaceae and is endemic to the south-west of Western Australia. It is a small, usually compact shrub with sweetly-perfumed, golden-yellow flowers which fade through reddish to almost black as they age.

== Description ==
Verticordia endlicheriana var. compacta is a compact shrub which grows to a height of 15–60 cm (6–20 in) and a width of 10–60 cm (4–20 in), with one to several main stems at the base. The leaves of the stems are linear in shape and 4–8 mm (0.2–0.3 in) long while those near the leaves are egg-shaped to almost round and 2–4 mm (0.08–0.2 in) long.

The flowers are sweetly-scented and arranged in round or corymb-like groups on erect stalks from 5–12 mm (0.2–0.5 in) long. The floral cup is broad, top-shaped, 0.6–0.8 mm (0.02–0.03 in) long, ribbed and glabrous. The sepals are golden-yellow, but age to orange, then red to brown and almost black and are 3–3.5 mm (0.12–0.14 in) long, with 6 to 8 hairy lobes. The petals are a similar colour to the sepals and their main body is 0.8–1.0 mm (0.03–0.04 in) wide and they have long, pointed, finger-like appendages. The style is 1.5–2.5 mm (0.06–0.1 in) long, straight and glabrous. Flowering occurs from August to November.

== Taxonomy and naming ==
Verticordia endlicheriana was first formally described by Johannes Conrad Schauer in 1844 and the description was published in Lehmann's Plantae Preissianae. In 1991, Alex George undertook a review of the genus Verticordia and described five varieties of Verticordia endlicheriana including this variety. The varietal name "compacta" refers to the compact, cauliflower-like form of the plant.

== Distribution and habitat ==
This variety grows in sand, sometimes over gravel, often with other verticordias in heath, shrubland or woodland. It occurs between the Latham, Mount Gibson, Moora and Dowerin areas in the Avon Wheatbelt, Geraldton Sandplains, Mallee and Swan Coastal Plain biogeographic regions.

== Conservation ==
Verticordia endlicheriana var. compacta is classified as "not threatened" by the Western Australian Government Department of Parks and Wildlife.

== Use in horticulture ==
Although this variety has excellent horticultural potential because of its compact habit and masses of brightly coloured, sweetly-scented flowers, it has proven difficult to establish in gardens. It is easy to propagate from cuttings but developing a mature plant from the struck cuttings has presented difficulties. Greater success has been obtained using gravelly or loamy soils rather than sand.
