= Acacia forrestiana =

Forrests's wattle

Conservation status
- Vulnerable (EPBC Act)

Scientific classification
- Kingdom: Plantae
- Clade: Tracheophytes
- Clade: Angiosperms
- Clade: Eudicots
- Clade: Rosids
- Order: Fabales
- Family: Fabaceae
- Subfamily: Caesalpinioideae
- Clade: Mimosoid clade
- Genus: Acacia
- Species: A. forrestiana

Binomial name
- Acacia forrestiana E.Pritz.
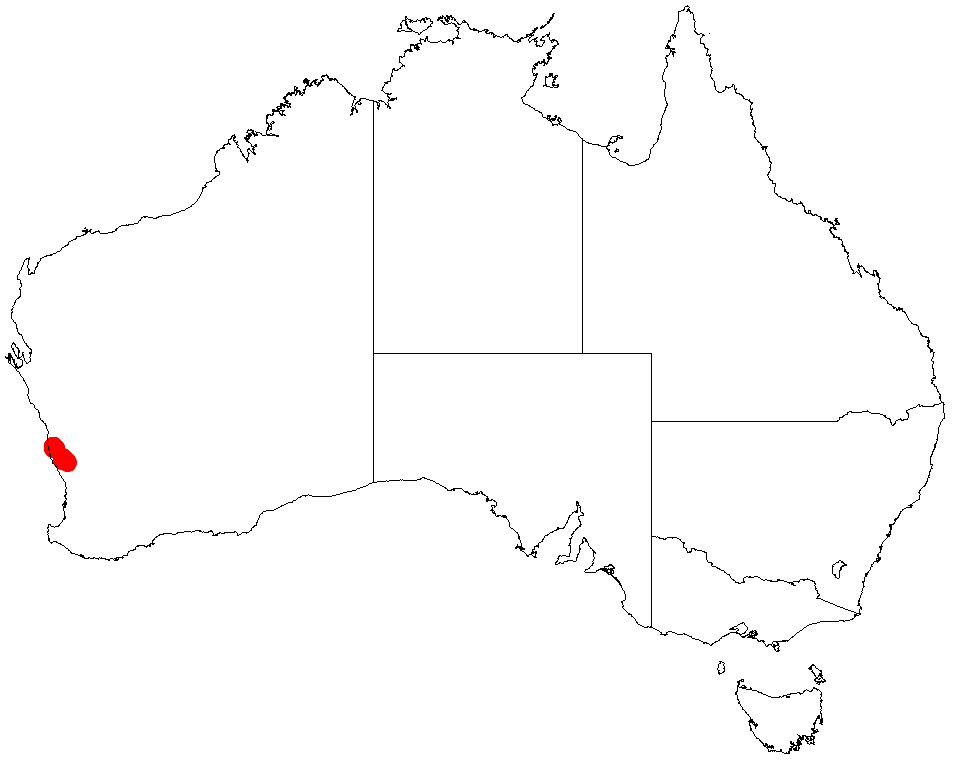
- Occurrence data from AVH

Synonyms
- Racosperma forrestianum (E.Pritz.) Pedley

Species of legume

Acacia forrestiana, commonly known as Forrest's wattle, is a species of flowering plant in the family Fabaceae and is endemic to the south-west of Western Australia. It is an erect shrub with ascending to erect, triangular phyllodes with the narrower end towards the base, spherical heads of pale yellow flowers and flat, oblong, leathery pods.

== Description ==
Acacia forrestiana is an erect shrub that typically grows to a height of 0.4–1 m (1 ft 4 in – 3 ft 3 in) and has branchlets with soft hairs. The phyllodes are somewhat crowded, ascending to erect, triangular with the narrower end towards the base, 10–20 mm (0.39–0.79 in) long, 5–10 mm (0.20–0.39 in) wide, sharply pointed and leathery. There are erect, bristly stipules 3–5 mm (0.12–0.20 in) long at the base of the phyllodes. The flowers are borne in spherical heads in axils on a peduncle 9–13 mm (0.35–0.51 in) long, each head with 15 to 20 pale yellow flowers. Flowering occurs in November and December, and the pods are oblong, flat, about 15 mm (0.59 in) long and 6 mm (0.24 in) wide, leathery, reddish-brown and striated.

== Taxonomy ==
Acacia forrestiana was first formally described in 1904 by the botanist Ernst Georg Pritzel in Botanische Jahrbücher für Systematik, Pflanzengeschichte und Pflanzengeographie from specimens collected near Dandaragan. The specific epithet (forrestiana) honours John Forrest.

This wattle is closely related to Acacia huegelii which is found further south and has a different phyllode shape.

== Distribution and habitat ==
This species of wattle is restricted to the Hill River district where it often grows in rocky or lateritic clay on the slopes of gullies, on hills or breakaways in heath or low woodland in the Geraldton Sandplains and Swan Coastal Plain bioregions of south-western Western Australia between Coorow and Dandaragan. It often grows with an overstorey of Eucalyptus wandoo and Eucalyptus calophylla with an understorey including Hakea lissocarpha and other species of Grevillea, Acacia, Isopogon, Calothamnus and Melaleuca.

== Conservation status ==
Acacia forrestiana is listed as "vulnerable" under the Australian Government Environment Protection and Biodiversity Conservation Act 1999 and the Western Australian Government Biodiversity Conservation Act 2016.

== See also ==
- List of Acacia species
