= Acacia imparilis =

Conservation status
- Priority Four — Rare Taxa (DEC)

Scientific classification
- Kingdom: Plantae
- Clade: Embryophytes
- Clade: Tracheophytes
- Clade: Spermatophytes
- Clade: Angiosperms
- Clade: Eudicots
- Clade: Rosids
- Order: Fabales
- Family: Fabaceae
- Subfamily: Caesalpinioideae
- Clade: Mimosoid clade
- Genus: Acacia
- Species: A. imparilis

Binomial name
- Acacia imparilis Maslin

Species of legume

Acacia imparilis is a species of flowering plant in the family Fabaceae and is restricted to a small area of the south west of Western Australia. It is an erect or sprawling, prickly shrub or subshrub with slightly s-shaped, narrowly oblong, egg-shaped or lance-shaped phyllodes with a hooked or beaked tip, spherical heads of cream-coloured to pale yellow flowers and linear to slightly curved pods.

== Description ==
Acacia imparilis is an erect or sprawling, prickly shrub or subshrub that typically grows to a height of 0.2–0.5 m (7.9 in – 1 ft 7.7 in). Its stems are slender and covered with soft hairs, The phyllodes are ascending to erect slightly s-shaped, narrowly oblong to egg-shaped or lance-shaped with the narrower end towards the base, 6–16 mm (0.24–0.63 in) long and 2–4.5 mm (0.079–0.177 in) wide, with a hooked, beaked or narrowed tip. There are linear to triangular stipules 2–4 mm (0.079–0.157 in) long at the base of the phyllodes. The flowers are cream-coloured to pale yellow and borne in a spherical head in axils, on a slender peduncle 7–10 mm (0.28–0.39 in) long. Flowering occurs in October, and the pods are linear to slightly curved, up to 50 mm (2.0 in) long 2.5 mm (0.098 in) wide, reddish brown and finely grooved. The (immature) seeds are oblong, about 5 mm (0.20 in) long with a conical aril on the end.

== Taxonomy ==
Acacia imparilis was first formally described in 1999 by Bruce Maslin in the journal Nuytsia from specimens he collected on Hamilla Hill, 15 km (9.3 mi) due west of Cranbrook in 1989. The specific epithet (imparilis) means 'unequal' and refers to its phyllode margins, which produce an asymmetric phyllode shape.

== Distribution ==
This species of wattle is found in, and near to the Stirling Range National Park in the Avon Wheatbelt, Esperance Plains and Jarrah Forest bioregions in the south west of Western Australia from around Cranbrook to Mount Barker where it grows on rocky hills in mallee scrub.

== Conservation status ==
Acacia imparilis is listed as "Priority Four" by the Government of Western Australia Department of Biodiversity, Conservation and Attractions, meaning that is rare or near threatened.

== See also ==
- List of Acacia species
