= Mount Lesueur =

Mesa in Western Australia

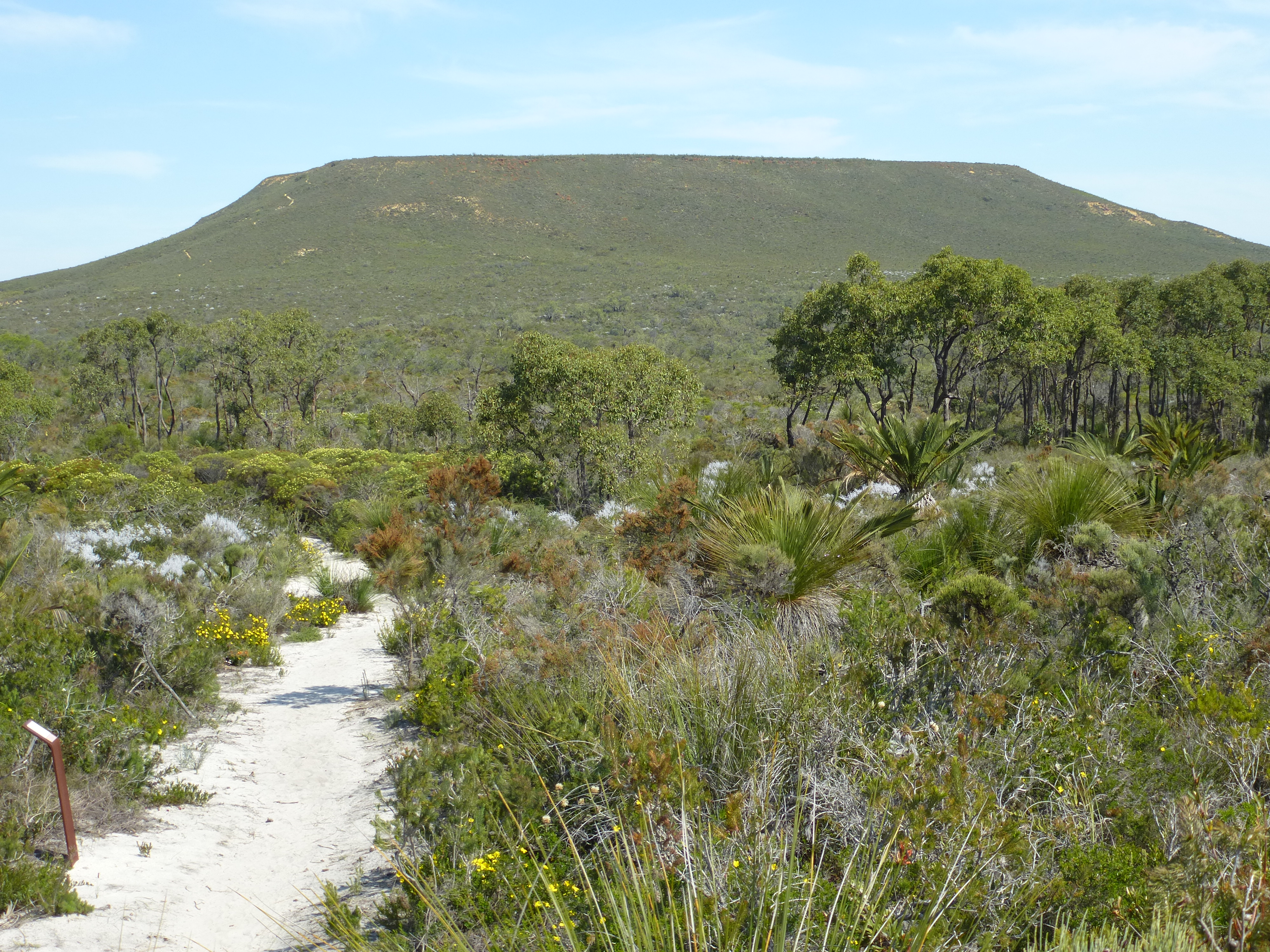

Highest point
- Elevation: 313 m (1,027 ft)
- Coordinates: 30°10′31.8″S 115°11′56.7″E

Geography
- Location within Western Australia
- Location: Western Australia
- Parent range: Gairdner Range

Mount Lesueur is a near-circular, flat-topped mesa located 21 kilometres (13 mi) from Jurien Bay in Western Australia. It rises above the surrounding lateritic plain of Lesueur National Park which has eroded away around it.

Mount Lesueur was first sighted and named by Europeans as the French ship the Naturaliste sailed past Jurien Bay on its voyage up the Western Australian coast. It was named in honour of Charles Alexander Lesueur, a natural history artist on board the ship. The next recorded sighting was by Captain George Grey, who led a small party through the area in 1839 after they were shipwrecked near Kalbarri. In 1849 a party led by A.C. Gregory ascended Mount Lesueur. They were followed the next year by botanical collector James Drummond on the first of his many visits to the area.

A reserve (No.24275) was created around Mount Lesueur for "educational purposes" in the 1950s. A more extensive area was gazetted as a national park in 1992.

Lesueur National Park has a high level of plant biodiversity an is an important area for botanical research and conservation.

It has been identified with coal geology.
