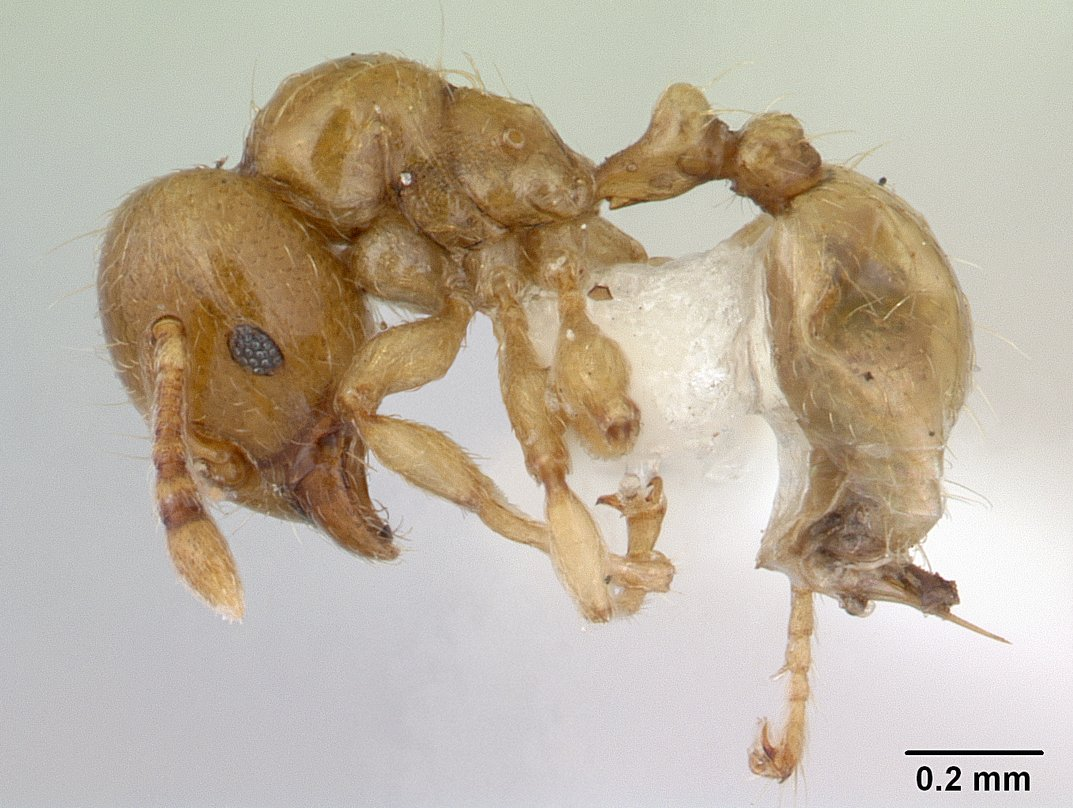
- A. decemarticulatus worker

Scientific classification
- Kingdom: Animalia
- Phylum: Arthropoda
- Clade: Pancrustacea
- Class: Insecta
- Order: Hymenoptera
- Family: Formicidae
- Subfamily: Myrmicinae
- Tribe: Attini
- Genus: Allomerus; Mayr, 1878

Type species
- Allomerus decemarticulatus Mayr, 1878

Diversity
- 19 species

= Allomerus =

Genus of ants

Allomerus is a Neotropical genus of small ants in the subfamily Myrmicinae. Its eight species are known from the forests of South America, where they live in plant cavities and structures.

== Species ==
- Allomerus affinis (Santschi, 1929)
- Allomerus auropunctatus (Roger, 1863)
- Allomerus brevipilosus Fernández, 2007
- Allomerus decemarticulatus Mayr, 1878
- Allomerus dentatus Fernández, 2007
- Allomerus iheringi (Forel, 1908)
- Allomerus longiseta (Cuezzo & Calcaterra, 2015)
- Allomerus lutzi Forel, 1908
- Allomerus maietae Fernández, 2007
- Allomerus octoarticulatus Mayr, 1878
- Allomerus rochai (Forel, 1912)
- Allomerus scrobifera (Kempf, 1961)
- Allomerus septemarticulatus Mayr, 1878
- Allomerus sigmoideus (Mayr, 1884)
- Allomerus sulcaticeps (Emery, 1894)
- Allomerus undecemarticulatus Fernández, 2007
- Allomerus villosus (Emery, 1894)
- Allomerus vogeli Kempf, 1975
- Allomerus williamsoni (Kusnezov, 1952)

== Associated plants ==
Table of known ant–host relations:

| Ant | Plant |
|---|---|
| A. brevipilosus | Gleasonia nauensis |
| A. decemarticulatus | Duroia sp. (probably), Gleasonia nauensis, Hirtella sp., Hirtella physophora, Tococa sp. (probably) |
| A. dentatus | Tococa hirta |
| A. maietae | Maieta neblinensis |
| A. octoarticulatus | Remijia physophora, Tococa sp. |
| A. septemarticulatus | Duroia saccifera |
| A. vogeli | Myrmidone macrosperma |
| A. undecemarticulatus | Tococa pachystachya |
