= Marilyn J. Roossinck =

American virologist and professor

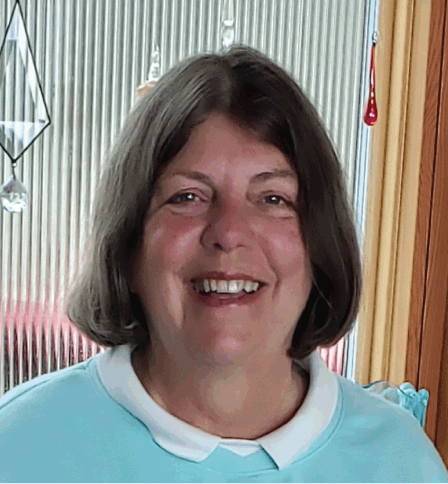
- Born: May 1954 (age 72); Michigan, United States
- Education: University of Colorado, Boulder (B.A.); University of Colorado School of Medicine (Ph.D.)
- Known for: Mutualistic virus-host symbioses; Yellowstone three-way symbiosis
- Scientific career
- Fields: Virology
- Workplaces: Pennsylvania State University; Samuel Roberts Noble Foundation

Marilyn J. Roossinck is an American virologist and professor emerita of virus ecology at Pennsylvania State University. She is known for her research on the ecology and evolution of RNA viruses and plants, particularly her work demonstrating mutualistic relationships between viruses and their hosts.

== Education ==
Roossinck grew up in rural Michigan, and is of German-Dutch ancestry. She received two B.A. degrees from the University of Colorado, Boulder in 1982, in Molecular Biology and in Evolutionary Biology. She completed her Ph.D. in Microbiology and Immunology at the University of Colorado School of Medicine in 1986, her doctoral research focused on the molecular biology of hepatitis B virus. She undertook a postdoctoral fellowship in plant virology at Cornell University, studying the genetics and evolution of cucumber mosaic virus.

== Career ==
In 1991, Roossinck joined the Samuel Roberts Noble Foundation in Ardmore, Oklahoma, as an assistant professor of Plant Biology. In 2011, she moved to Penn State's Center for Infectious Disease Dynamics, Huck Institute of Life Sciences, as a full professor, holding joint appointments in the Department of Plant Pathology and Environmental Microbiology and the Eberly College of Science. She taught a course in virus ecology at Penn State and retired in August 2021.

She performed some of the first experimental evolution studies on plant RNA viruses. Using Cytomegalovirus as a model system. A focus of her work is virus biodiversity in wild plants. She pioneered the use of deep sequencing to survey viruses in terrestrial ecosystems and found that horizontally transmitted viruses are the most common type of virus in wild plants.

In 2007 Roossinck co-discovered a tripartite symbiosis in the panic grass Dichanthelium lanuginosum of Yellowstone, which grows in geothermal soils and depends on a symbiotic fungus, Curvularia protuberata. Roossinck and colleagues discovered that the fungus confers heat tolerance only when it is itself infected by a virus, later named the "Curvularia thermal tolerance virus". When the fungus was cured of the virus, the heat tolerance was lost. The same effect was observed in tomatoes. Roossinck has described this project as the work she is most proud of.

Roossinck has argued that the proportion of viruses that function as pathogens is small, estimating it at around one percent, with most virus-host interactions being harmless or beneficial. In a 2011 review in Nature Reviews Microbiology, she catalogued mutualistic virus-host relationships across bacteria, fungi, plants, insects, and mammals, including cases where viruses confer drought tolerance, cold tolerance, or protection against unrelated pathogens.

== Books ==
Roossinck edited the academic volume Plant Virus Evolution (Springer, 2008) and has authored two popular science books: Virus: An Illustrated Guide to 101 Incredible Microbes (Princeton University Press, 2016), with a foreword by Carl Zimmer; and Viruses: A Natural History (Princeton University Press, 2023), a broad account of viruses in ecology and evolution.

== See also ==
- Plant virus
