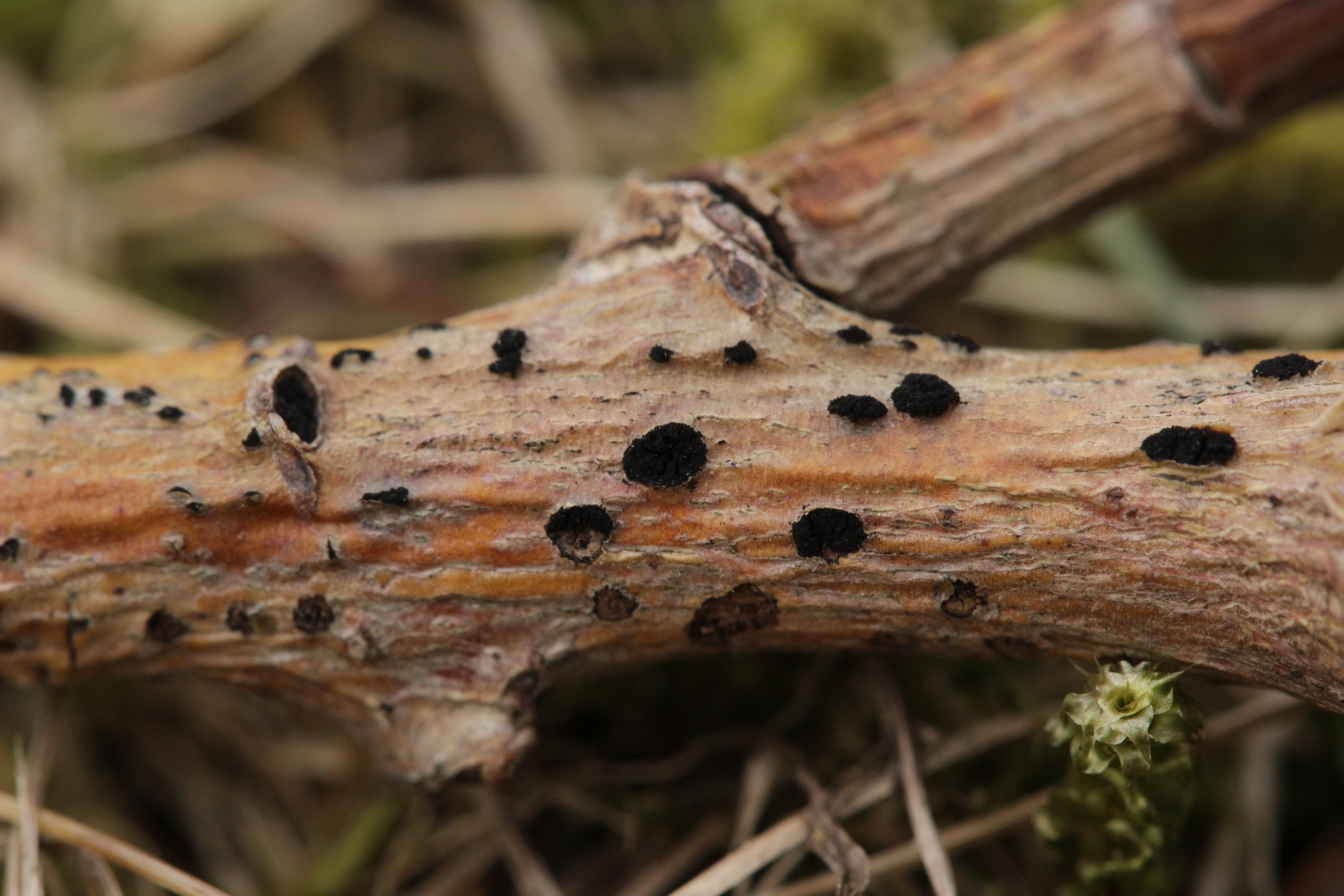
- Trimmatostroma betulinum

Scientific classification
- Kingdom: Fungi
- Division: Ascomycota
- Class: Leotiomycetes
- Order: Helotiales
- Family: Mollisiaceae
- Genus: Trimmatostroma; Corda (1837)

Type species
- Trimmatostroma salicis Corda (1837)

= Trimmatostroma =

Genus of fungi

Trimmatostroma is a genus of asexual fungi in the order Helotiales (Leotiomycetes, Ascomycota), first described by the Czech naturalist A.C.J. Corda in 1837. The genus belongs to the hyphomycetes, the informal grouping of fungi that produce conidia directly on hyphae or conidiophores rather than enclosed in a fruiting body. It is known for its relationship with Allomerus decemarticulatus ants.

== Description ==
Trimmatostroma are melanised hyphomycetes. On natural substrates they typically form pulvinate or stromatic conidiomata. Conidia are dark brown, multicellular, and borne in chains; they arise by intercalary dilatation of fertile hyphae. S.J. Hughes argued that T. salicis and Coniothecium betulinum Corda could not reasonably be held in separate genera given their shared basipetal chain development, and formally transferred the latter to Trimmatostroma as T. betulinum.

== Ecology ==
Most species are saprobic, occurring on dead bark, twigs, and other plant substrates. Several species are lichenicolous, growing on or within the thalli of lichens. Trimmatostroma abietis, described from conifer needles in Germany, has also been recorded from stone surfaces, where it colonises substrates with low water activity. Some former lichenicolous members have been reclassified under the Intralichen genus on the basis of their endothallic growth and shared conidial characters. Molecular data have further shown that the type species of Trimmatostroma belongs within Helotiales, while the superficially similar genus Catenulostroma belongs to a different lineage (Teratosphaeriaceae, Dothideomycetes).

== Ant-plant codependant covenant ==
An unidentified Trimmatostroma sp. (placed in Chaetothyriales) is part of a tripartite symbiosis with the Neotropical ant Allomerus decemarticulatus and its host plant Hirtella physophora (Chrysobalanaceae) in French Guiana.

Workers of A. decemarticulatus cut trichomes from the stems of H. physophora, assemble them into a frame, and manipulate the fungal mycelium to consolidate the structure into a gallery riddled with holes through which the ants ambush large insect prey. The association is not opportunistic: molecular analysis shows the ants maintain a genetically specific cultivar, with evidence of active fungal selection and likely vertical transmission between ant generations. In addition to its structural role, the fungus improves nitrogen uptake by the host plant, with hyphae penetrating stem tissue and facilitating transfer of nitrogen from prey to plant.

== Selected species ==
- Trimmatostroma salicis Corda (1837) — type species; on willow bark
- Trimmatostroma betulinum (Corda) S.Hughes (1953) — on dead bark of Betula and other trees
- Trimmatostroma abietis Butin, Pehl & de Hoog (1996) — on conifer needles and stone
- Trimmatostroma umbilicariicola Heuchert & Braun (2014) — lichenicolous, on Umbilicaria spp.
- Trimmatostroma varicellariae Heuchert & Braun (2014) — lichenicolous, on Varicellaria rhodocarpa

== See also ==
- Tripartite symbiosis
- Allomerus decemarticulatus#Fungal symbiosis
