= Tripartite symbiosis =

Type of symbiosis

Tripartite symbiosis is a type of symbiosis involving three species. This can include any combination of plants, animals, fungi, bacteria, or archaea, often in interkingdom symbiosis.

== Ants ==
=== Fungus-growing ants ===
Ants of Attini cultivate fungi. Microfungi, specialized to be parasites of the fungus gardens, coevolved with them.

=== Allomerus-Hirtella-Trimmatostroma ===
Allomerus decemarticulatus ants use Trimmatostroma sp. to create structures within Hirtella physophora. The fungi are connected endophytically and actively transfer nitrogen.

== Grass ==
Dichanthelium lanuginosum is a species of rosette grass native to North America. It is most common in the central and eastern United States. It is found in a variety of habitats, mostly in open, dry areas.

A variety, D. lanuginosum var. thermale, grows in geothermal areas of Yellowstone National Park, United States. It is able to withstand high temperatures and high acidity in its rhizosphere. In 2007 it was found that the heat tolerance is conferred to the grass by a symbiosis between a fungus and a virus. When it is colonised by the fungus Curvularia protuberata and the fungus is in turn colonised by a particular virus, the grass is able to tolerate soil temperatures of up to 65 °C that would otherwise be lethal. Due to the distinctiveness and isolation of this taxon, it is sometimes considered to be a separate species: Dichanthelium thermale.

== Lichen ==
The mycobiont in a lichen can form a relationship with both cyanobacteria and green algae as photobionts concurrently.

== Legumes ==
Rhizobia are nitrogen-fixating bacteria that form symbiotic relationships with legumes. Sometimes, this is aided by the presence of a fungal species. This is most effective in undistributed soil. The presence of mycorrhizae can improve the rhizobial-liquorice nutrient transfer in droughts. Soybeans in particular can improve their ability to withstand soil salinity with the presence of both rhizobium and mycorrhizae.
