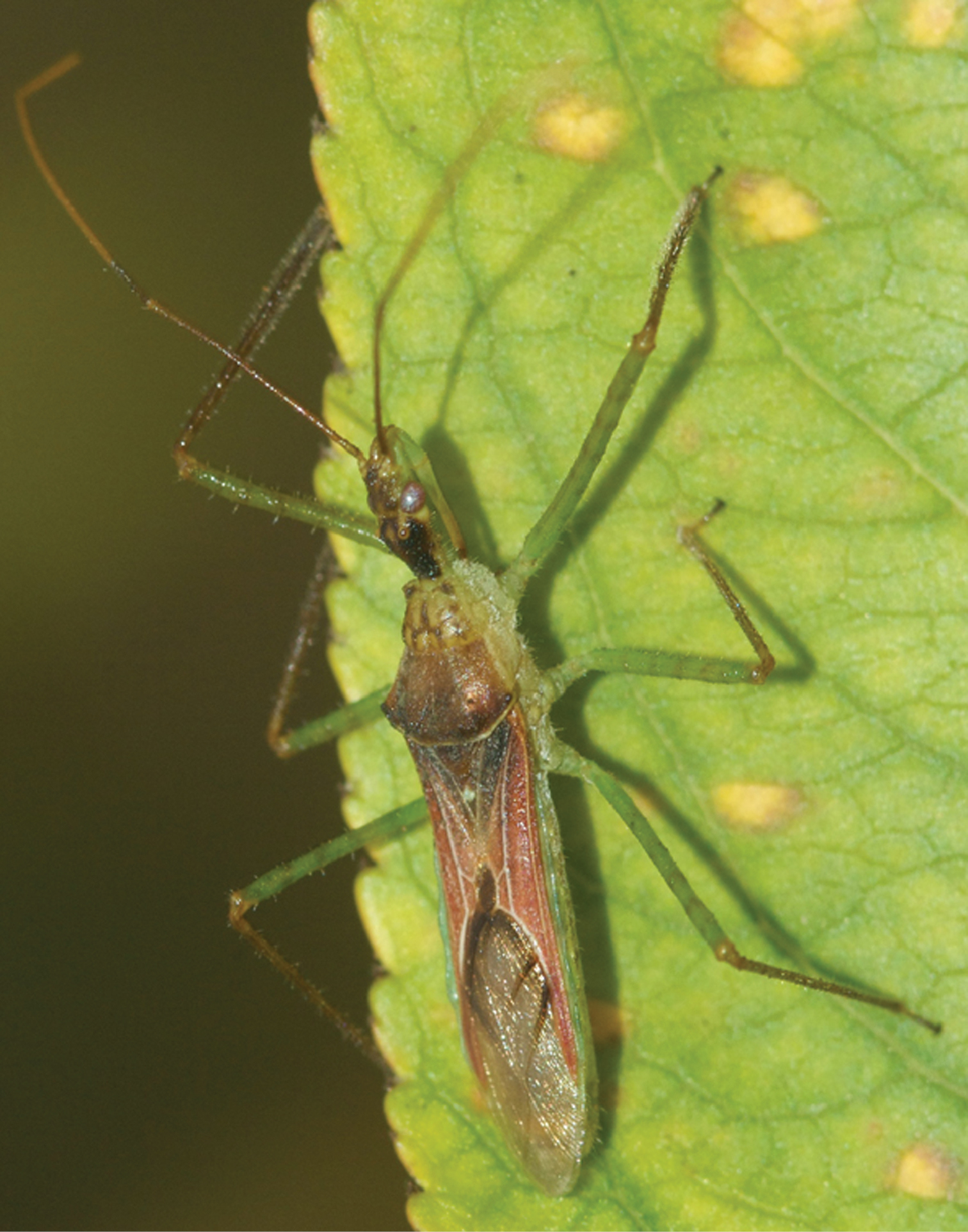

Scientific classification
- Kingdom: Animalia
- Phylum: Arthropoda
- Class: Insecta
- Order: Hemiptera
- Suborder: Heteroptera
- Family: Reduviidae
- Genus: Zelus
- Species: Z. renardii

Binomial name
- Zelus renardii Kolenati, 1856

= Zelus renardii =

Species of true bug

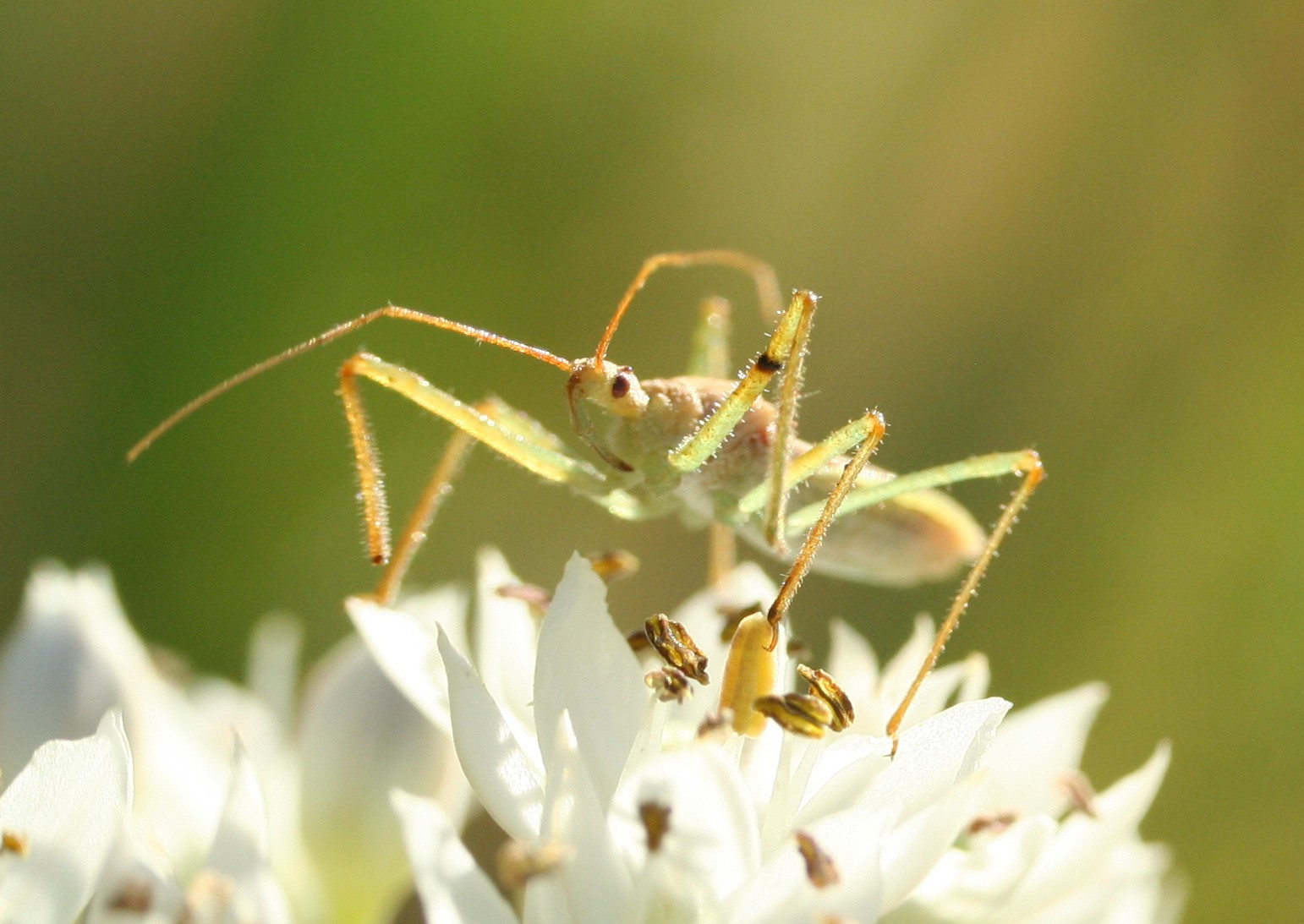
A front view of an adult Zelus renardii, showing the rostrum.

Zelus renardii, commonly known as the leaf hopper assassin bug, is a predacious insect contained within tribe Harpactorini. Diurnal and found on both wild and crop plants, Z. renardii has spread from its native habitats in western North and Central America into three other biogeographic regions across the globe.

Zelus renardii is considered a sister species to Z. cervicalis, as they share two unique characters: the lateral margins of dorsal phallothecal sclerite are recurved, and the medial process is strongly hooked apically.

== Distribution and spread ==
=== Native ===
The native range of Z. renardii extends over various climatic zones throughout mainland North and Central America at altitudes between 8m to 2000m above sea level. Native ranges include tropical, dry, semi-arid, arid, and Mediterranean climates. Additionally, Z. renardii also appears well suited to urban and disturbed areas, as it has been observed in suburban areas on both native and non-native herbaceous and woody plants, as well as common garden plants. Egg masses can frequently be found on vegetable plants. Z. renardii is also sympatric with Z. tetracantus over a large part of its range in western USA, Mexico, Guatemala, Jamaica, and other parts of Central America.

=== Non-native ===
The adaptability to multiple habitat conditions may have facilitated its spread in non-native regions as they have preadaptations to diverse climatic condition. To date, Z. renardii has expanded to Hawaii, where they preyed mainly on invasive sugarcane leafhopper (Perkinsiella saccharicida) and other tropical areas within the Pacific, such as Johnston Atoll, Samoa, and the Philippines. Z. renardii has also been reported in Mediterranean-type environments within Chile and Argentina.

Expansion of Z. renardii throughout Europe began in Mediterranean regions, namely Greece and Spain. However, expansion has continued and Z. renardii is now known in multiple countries in the Mediterranean basin, such as France, Italy, Turkey and Albania. The majority of these observations have been from urban areas. Eight years post-introduction in Spain, Z. renardii had a limited expansion in Mediterranean-type habitats, and was mainly limited to coastal regions of the Iberian east and south from the city of Valencia to Malaga. Additionally, Z. renardii has been observed as far southeast as the Kfar Masaryk region of northern Israel.

Given the abundance of Z. renardii in anthropogenic environments, humans are likely the main vectors of transport into non-native habitats. Since eggs, which are typically glued to plants, take 8–12 days to hatch and both the 1st and 2nd instars typically remain in the areas around their hatching site, shipping of nursery plants or plant products is thought to be a major avenue of distribution into non-native locations. Disturbed and agricultural areas are suitable for Z. renardii and may also contribute to its spread throughout native and non-native regions once established.

== Microhabitat ==
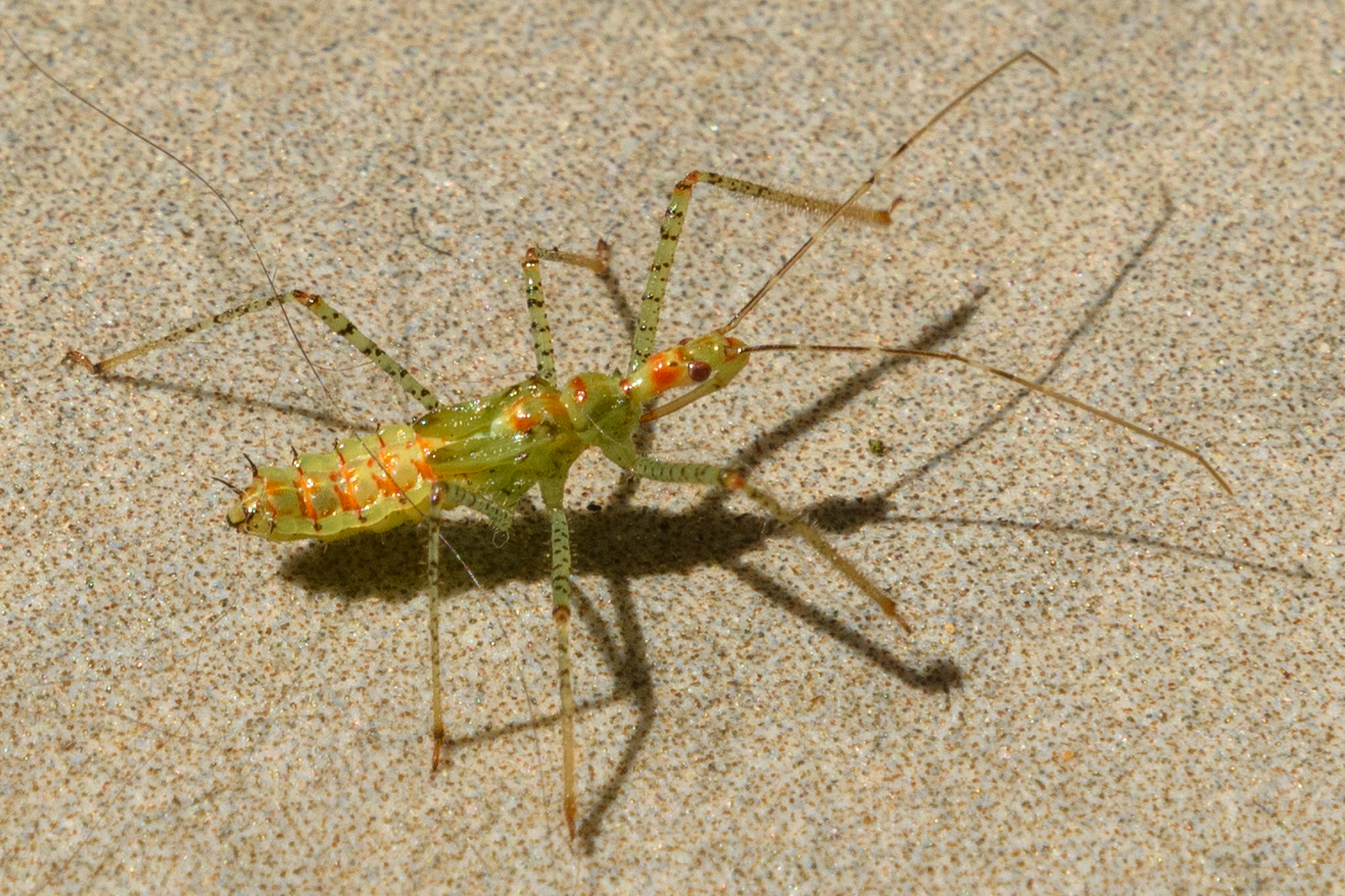
Nymph of Zelus renardii seen in southern France

There appears to be no pattern of host-plant preference in Z. renardii, as it can be caught while beating and sweeping both flowering and non-flowering vegetation. Z. renardii is also common in agricultural and even urban and suburban environments.

Zelus renardii also exhibits different vertical distributions depending on age. Nymphs occupied and foraged on lower parts of plants, whereas adults spent most of their time in the upper parts of plants, which may be a mechanism to avoid either competition between individuals or cannibalism. These differences in microhabitats may affect prey encounter rates.

== Anatomy and morphology ==
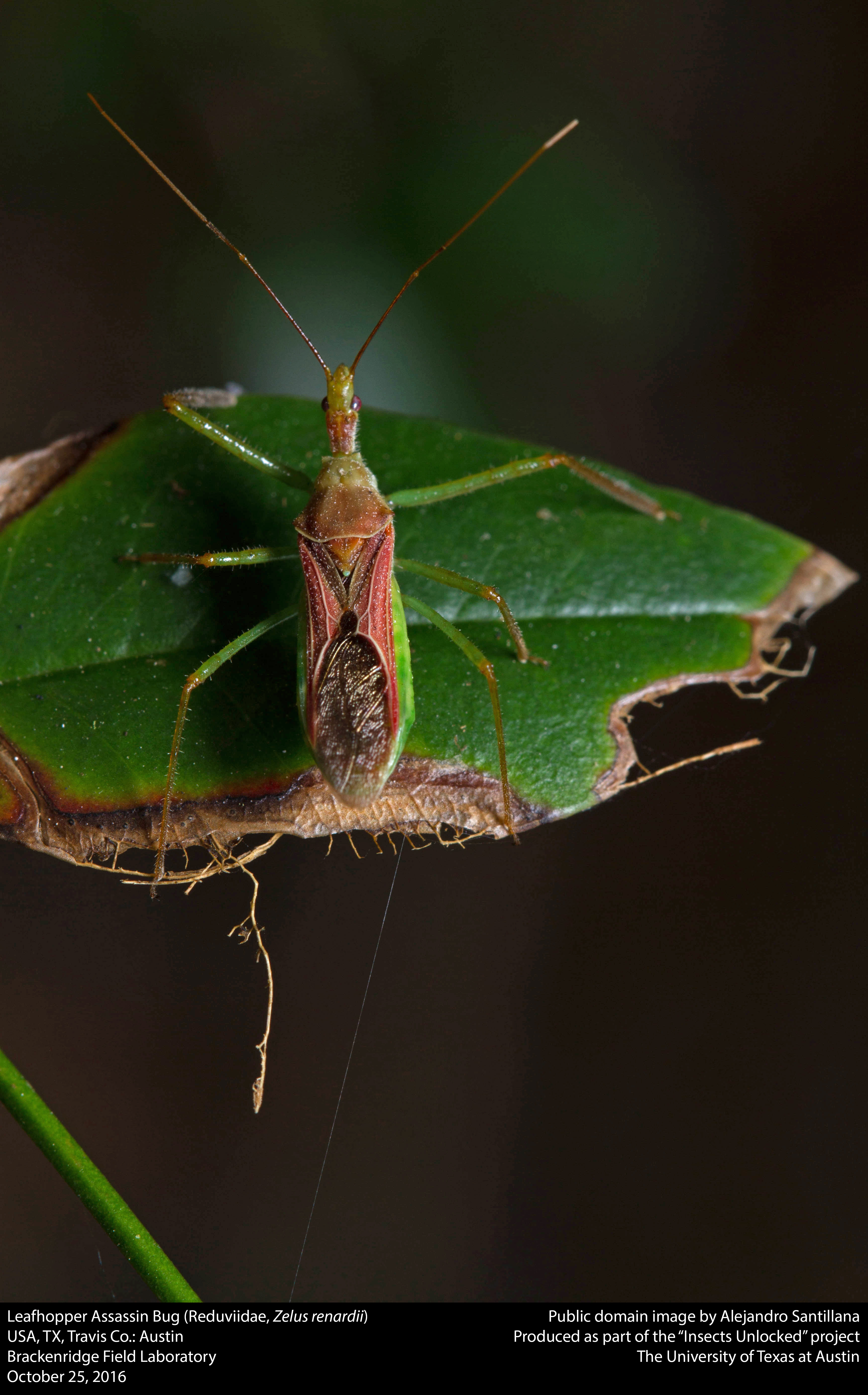
Zelus renardii adult on vegetation

=== Adults ===
Zelus renardii is a medium to large hemipteran with an average total length between 10.57 and 14.25 mm. It is generally greenish-yellow ventrally and yellow-brown dorsally, with the corium distinctly reddish with paler venation. It also has a long, robust body with a cylindrical head, small reddish eyes, and a thick curved rostrum. The front tibia are covered posteriorly by glandular setae which secrete a sticky substance. Distinguishing it from other Zelus species, the scutellum is long and bears no projections and the last ventral abdominal segment is slender with a hooked median process apically.

Females are similar to male except larger in total length 12.14-14.25 mm (versus 10.57 – 12.98 mm in males), and the hemelytron extend slightly beyond the tip of the abdomen.

=== Eggs ===
Zelus renardii eggs are small, kidney-shaped, and light brown in colour. They are generally laid in masses and glued to the surfaces of vegetation.

== Reproductive behaviour ==
=== Precopulation and copulation ===
During mating, pairs of Z. renardii can copulate between 1 and 3 times per day. The female may exhibit defensive behaviour at any stage, resulting in failure of the males mating attempt. Precopulatory behaviour begins with antennal movement by both sexes. When the male is ready to mate, he approaches the female from either the front or the back; likelihood of rejection depends on the approach and mounting position. If the male approaches and tries to mount from the front, the female is more likely to exhibit defensive behaviour like foreleg raising or striking. But if the male approaches from the front and female is receptive, there is a short precopulatory period where both sexes stridulate by rubbing their rostra against prosternal grooves. Alternatively, females are less likely to exhibit defensive behaviour when the male approaches from behind; and, if the female is receptive, only the female exhibits rostral stridulation.

Mating begins when the male is able to mount the female dorsally and maintains her position by grasping her with his legs and rostrum. The male then initiates contact by tapping his rostrum against the pronotum and head of the female. This is followed by the extension of male genitalia. Once the copulatory organs are engaged, the male shifts laterally to either side of the female depending on how his aedeagus is engaged within. The majority of males shift to the right of the female while gripping her by the thorax and abdomen with his middle and hind legs, and the forelegs gripping her head. Copulation can last anywhere between 15 and 25 minutes. After copulation, the male repositions himself on top of the female and remains there for 1 to 2 minutes as his body vibrates rhythmically. These vibrations are not unique to Z. renardii, as they are also seen in Z. socius.

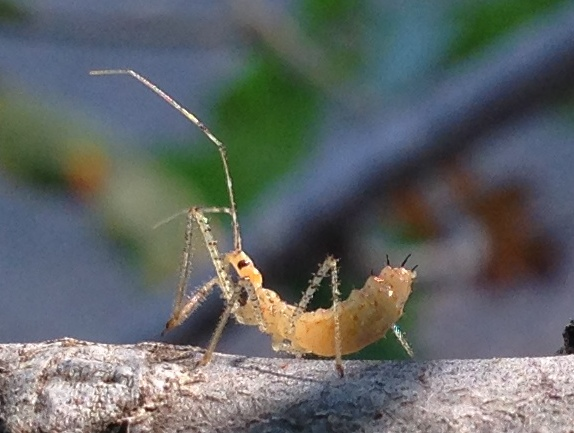
Zelus renardii nymph

=== Postcopulation ===
During oviposition, eggs are glued on plant surfaces, typically the ventral surfaces of leaves, or sometimes on anthropogenic materials, and a solidifying gelatinous mass is then laid over top. The amount of eggs deposited appears variable, with the average amount of eggs laid by females in captivity ranging from 17 to 23 eggs during one reproductive period, to an average of 2.5 egg masses, with approximately 35.5 eggs/mass, during another. Eggs typically take 8–12 days to hatch, but may take up to 16–33 days in experimental settings, with all eggs in an egg mass hatching within one hour of each other. 67% of eggs laid have viable 1st instars, and nymphs generally reach maturity in two months. If food is available, 1st instar nymphs begin to feed two hours after hatching . However, both 1st and 2nd instars do not move far from the egg mass because of the post-hatching benefits it provides. Z. renardii may provide parental care by supplying post-hatching benefits to the nymphs. This is accomplished through the deposition of sticky substances with the egg masses, which helps mitigate threats and increase survival of the young. The 1st instars usually remain in close proximity to the eggs they hatched from to gather the sticky substances onto their foreleg and middle legs, and then return periodically to reapply the substances until they are able to produce their own autogenously. Use of these substances can improve their ability to attach to substrates and increase predation success per predation attempt.

== Diet breadth and general feeding behaviour ==
Adult and nymph Z. renardii are zoophagous generalist predators which feed on a wide range of prey, from herbivorous insects that feed on wild and crop plants to other insect predators, like lacewings. Nymphs mainly feed on herbivorous insects between 0.5 and 4mm in length, such as aphids, weevils, and thrips, whereas adults feed on larger prey items between 1.5 and 19 mm in length from various orders, including Hemiptera, Lepidoptera, Coleoptera, Hymenoptera, Neuroptera, Blattodea, and Orthoptera. Since Z. renardii feeds on such a wide variety of prey, its diet may shift under different ecological conditions or between habitats which have different prey composition and abundance. Although Z. renardii is a predaceous insect, the 1st and 2nd instars may utilize some plant material, such as pollen or nectar from extrafloral nectaries on the bottom of leaves or fruiting structures, as a supplement to their regular zoophagous diet or to sustain them for short periods when more suitable prey is not available.

Zelus renardii is also an important intraguild predator of lacewings and other insect predators. Z. renardii shows changes in prey preferences across developmental stages which influences the relevance of intraguild predation. The intensity of intraguild predation on other predators increases with the age of Z. renardii, as adults fed on larger prey and on a greater proportion of predatory species than 2nd instars.

=== Predatory behaviour ===
Prey captured in the wild usually occurs on vegetation, and Z. renardii will remain relatively exposed during feeding. Therefore, a shorter predation and feeding time is hypothesized to be an ecological advantage that reduces predation risk. Prey detection is thought to be primarily based on movement, as moving prey are captured at a higher frequency, whereas more sessile prey, like cotton aphids, are subjected to less predation, even if they are present in high abundance. Smaller, more mobile prey are ambushed while less mobile prey are stalked. Generally, predatory behaviour of Z. renardii proceeds as follows: antennal movement in direction of prey, aiding in detection. Once Z. renardii detects prey, it slowly moves towards the prey with forelegs lifted and antennae projected forwards. A sticky substance, secreted by glands on the tibia, increase the success of prey capture and prevent its escape. The stylet is then inserted and pre-oral digestive agents are excreted into the prey, paralyzing and liquifying them.

The entire feeding period on medium to large prey items takes between 60 and 80 minutes. After feeding, intense rostral and antennal grooming occurs.

== Adaptations for predation ==
Species within the subfamily Harpactorinae, commonly called sticky trap bugs, are able to capture prey through the use of sticky substances; for members of the tribe Harpactorinii, these sticky substances are mainly on their forelegs and middle legs. Viscous, sticky substances are secreted by dermal glands in more mature individuals. However, 1st instar nymphs are not able to produce these substances autogenously, and must gather them from the egg masses in which they hatched. 1st instars typically initiate application of these substances 25 minutes post-hatching in order to improve predation success and substrate adhesion. By clasping their secretion-coated forelegs around prey, escape is significantly reduced. Additionally, sticky substances on their middle and/or hindlegs provides better adhesion to substrates, like plant surface, which is important for ambushing and handling struggling prey. The exact developmental stage when Z. renardii produces their own sticky substance is unknown.

A key adaptation to Z. renardii's generalist predation style is the utilization of pre-oral digestion. By liquifying prey prior to ingestion, the nutrient-rich food can be selectively ingested, increasing the efficiency of predation and allowing consumption of larger or more intractable prey items. The rapid liquifaction of prey items is thought to be due to proteinase enzymes produced by the salivary glands and injected in the saliva by the stylet. It is an important first step in the digestive process of Z. renardii, as the ingested material can undergo further hydrolysis in the anterior midgut as a function of the ingestion of disgorged salivary proteinases and endopeptidase activity. As the ingested material moves to the posterior midgut and hindgut, it is now composed of shortened peptide chains, which allows exopeptidases to continue hydrolysis. Endopeptidase activity continues in the hindgut, where nutrients are absorbed. Endopeptidase activity in the salivary glands and anterior midgut and exopeptidase activity in the posterior midgut and hindgut is thought to be an adaptation to acquiring food from a mainly solid form as it allows decreased prey handling time and decreases time of vulnerability during feeding.

== Possible impacts on agriculture ==
As Z. renardii feeds on many herbivorous pest species of cotton, maize, soybean, alfalfa, and fruit tree crops, it can be considered a biological control agent. However, even though prey items of Z. renardii are often considered pests in an agricultural context, some beneficial species that are also used as biological control in agricultural systems are preyed upon. Due to its generalist diet, Z. renardii can function as an important intraguild predator on arthropods, such as the lacewing Chrysoperla carnea, which is commonly used to control cotton aphids (Aphis gossypii). As it consumes herbivorous pests and other predators of that pest, it can disrupt the trophic cascades that the biological control agent is being used to impose in anthropogenic systems, and can indirectly cause the abundance of the pest to rise. This affect may be prevented if Z. renardii's preference for the other predator is low relative to its preference for the shared prey.
