= Thermophyte =

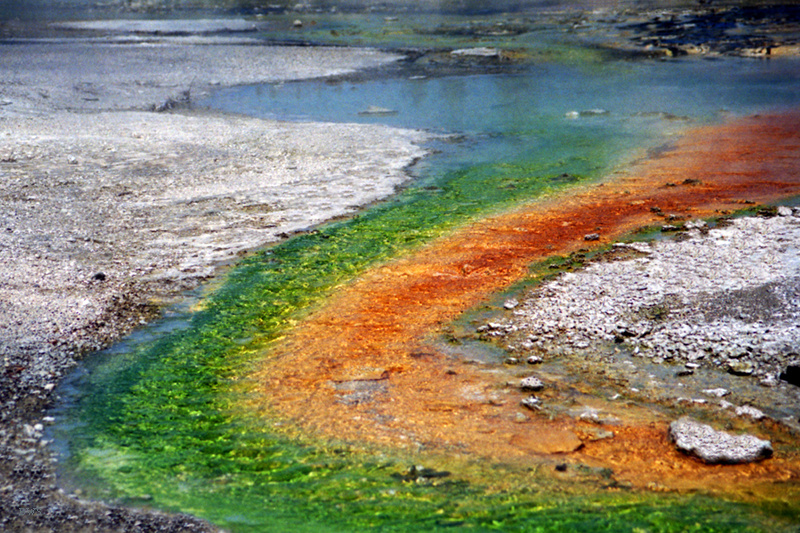
Hot-springs with bacteria, cyanobacteria, and algae in Yellowstone National Park

Thermophyte (Greek thérmos = warmth, heat + phyton = plant) is an organism which is tolerant or thriving at high temperatures. These organisms are categorized according to ecological valences at high temperatures, including biological extremes. Such organisms include hot-spring taxa also.

A large amount of thermophytes are algae, more specifically blue-green algae, also referred to as cyanobacteria. This type of algae thrives in hot conditions ranging anywhere from 50 to 70 degrees Celsius, which other plants and organisms cannot survive in. Thermophytes are able to survive extreme temperatures as their cells contain an "unorganized nucleus".

As the name suggests, thermophytes are found in high temperatures. They can be found in abundance in and around places like freshwater hot springs, such as Yellowstone National Park and in Lassen Volcanic National Park.

== Mutualism in thermophytes ==
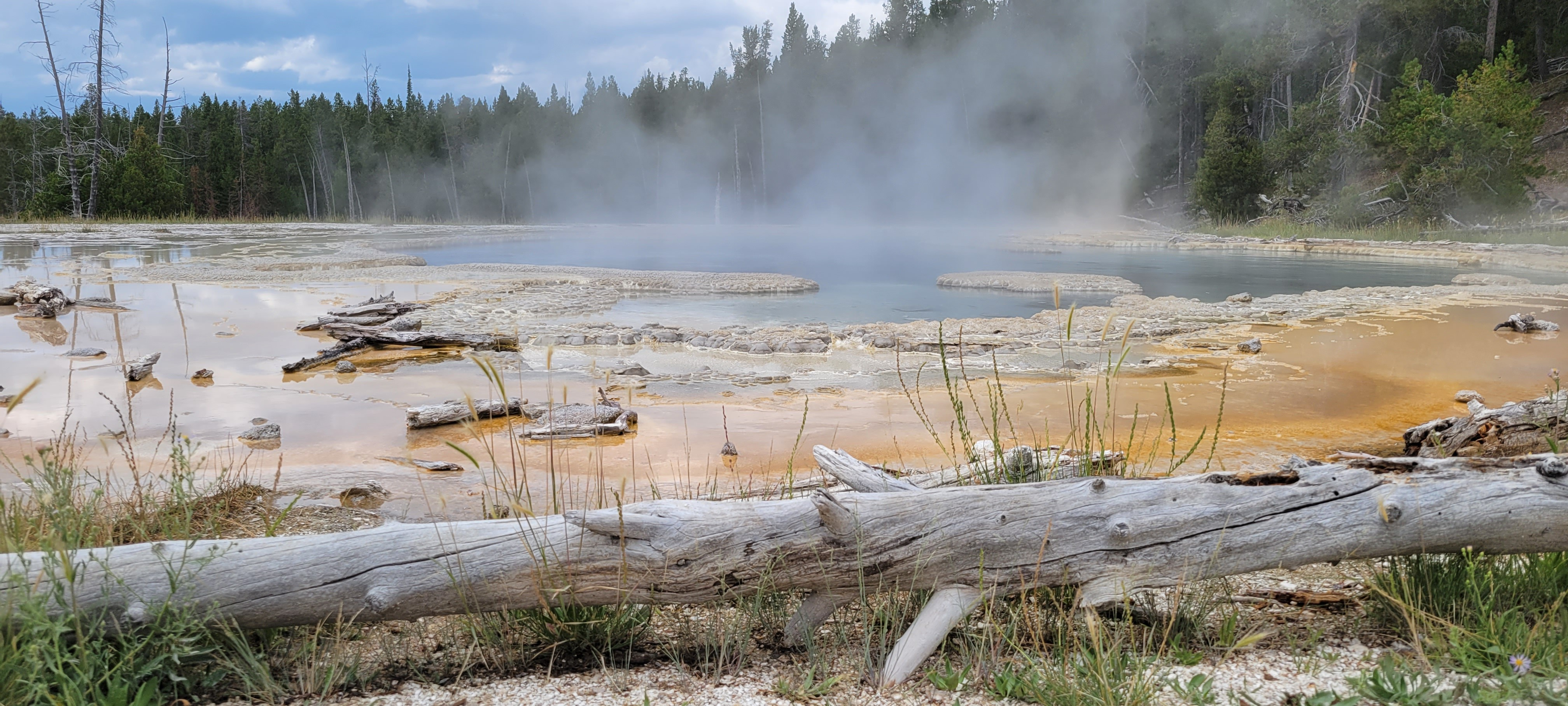
Image of Yellowstone National Park hot spring surrounded by thermophytic plants taken in July 2021.

There are instances in which a fungus and plant become thermophytes by forming a symbiotic relationship with one another. Some thermophytes live with a fungal partner in a symbiotic relationship with plants, algae, and viruses. Mutualists like the panic grass and its fungal partner cannot survive individually, but thrive when they are in the symbiotic relationship. This means the fungus, plant, and virus function together to survive in such extreme conditions by benefiting from each other. The fungi typically dwell in the intracellular spaces between the plant's cells.

In a study performed by researchers at Montana State University and the University of Washington, it was discovered that the panic grass Dichanthelium lanuginosum living near the hot springs in Yellowstone National Park thrive due to their relationship with the endomycorrhizal fungus Curvularia protuberata. Neither organism can survive on their own at such high temperatures. Certain mycoviruses appear to infect the fungi that live within these plants and confer heat resistance to the colonized plants. The mechanisms through which heat tolerance is induced are not established, but may relate to the production of osmolytes by the colonized plant to reduce heat stress or the attenuation of reactive oxygen species generated by the plant's stress response system.

The study at Washington State has led to the discovery of a way to use these relationships between fungi and plants to make crops more thermo-tolerant, allowing them to resist damage by heat.

The most famous of these ecological groups of organisms are:

- Deinococcota, including Thermus aquaticus, a species of bacteria.
- Cyanobacteria, blue-green algae.
- Oscillatoria terebriformis
- Oscillatoria brevis
- Heterohormogonium (motile cell filaments formed by cyanobacteria)
- Synechococcus elongatus
- Scytonema
- Panic grass (panic grass with a fungal association with Curvularia)

== See also ==
- Thermophile – Organism that thrives at relatively high temperatures
