= Tetracanthus =

Tetracanthus (Greek "four spines") is an epithet for several different species:

- Nandopsis tetracanthus, a fish in the genus Nandopsis
- Neolamprologus tetracanthus, a fish
- Scatophagus tetracanthus, a fish in the genus Scatophagus
- Zelus tetracanthus, an insect in the genus Zelus
- Echinocactus tetracanthus, synonym of Parodia erinacea, a cactus in the genus Parodia
