= Hirtella zanzibarica subsp. megacarpa =

Conservation status
- Near Threatened (IUCN 3.1)

Scientific classification
- Kingdom: Plantae
- Clade: Tracheophytes
- Clade: Angiosperms
- Clade: Eudicots
- Clade: Rosids
- Order: Malpighiales
- Family: Chrysobalanaceae
- Genus: Hirtella
- Species: H. zanzibarica
- Subspecies: H. z. subsp. megacarpa

Trinomial name
- Hirtella zanzibarica subsp. megacarpa (R.A.Graham) Prance

Synonyms
- Hirtella megacarpa R.A.Graham

Species of flowering plant

Hirtella zanzibarica subsp. megacarpa is a subspecies of flowering plant in the family Chrysobalanaceae. It is endemic to Tanzania.
