= Mycovirus =

Virus that infects fungi

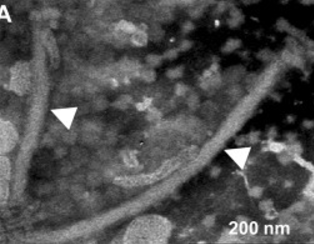
Virions of "Sclerotinia sclerotiorum negative-stranded RNA virus 1" (SsNSRV-1), a mycovirus of family "Mymonaviridae".

Mycoviruses (Ancient Greek: μύκης mykes ("fungus") + Latin virus), also known as mycophages, are viruses that infect fungi. The majority of mycoviruses have double-stranded RNA (dsRNA) genomes and isometric particles, but approximately 30% have positive-sense, single-stranded RNA (+ssRNA) genomes.

True mycoviruses demonstrate an ability to be transmitted to infect other healthy fungi. Many double-stranded RNA elements that have been described in fungi do not fit this description, and in these cases they are referred to as virus-like particles or VLPs. Preliminary results indicate that most mycoviruses co-diverge with their hosts, i.e. their phylogeny is largely congruent with that of their primary hosts. However, many virus families containing mycoviruses have only sparsely been sampled. Mycovirology is the study of mycoviruses. It is a special subdivision of virology and seeks to understand and describe the taxonomy, host range, origin and evolution, transmission and movement of mycoviruses and their impact on host phenotype.

== History ==
The first record of an economic impact of mycoviruses on fungi was recorded in cultivated mushrooms (Agaricus bisporus) in the late 1940s and was called the La France disease. Hollings found more than three different types of viruses in the abnormal sporophores. This report essentially marks the beginning of mycovirology.

The La France Disease is also known as X disease, watery stripe, dieback and brown disease. Symptoms include:

- Reduced yield
- Slow and aberrant mycelial growth
- Waterlogging of tissue
- Malformation
- Premature maturation
- Increased post-harvest deterioration (reduced shelf life)

Mushrooms have shown no resistance to the virus, and so control has been limited to hygienic practises to stop the spread of the virus.

Perhaps the best known mycovirus is Cryphonectria parasitica hypovirus 1 (CHV1). CHV1 is exceptional within mycoviral research for its success as a biocontrol agent against the fungus C. parasitica, the causative agent of chestnut blight, in Europe, but also because it is a model organism for studying hypovirulence in fungi. However, this system is only being used in Europe routinely because of the relatively small number of vegetative compatibility groups (VCGs) on the continent. By contrast, in North America the distribution of the hypovirulent phenotype is often prevented because an incompatibility reaction prevents fungal hyphae from fusing and exchanging their cytoplasmic content. In the United States, at least 35 VCGs were found. A similar situation seems to be present in China and Japan, where 71 VCGs have been identified so far.

== Taxonomy ==
The majority of mycoviruses have double-stranded RNA (dsRNA) genomes and isometric particles, but approximately 30% have positive-sense, single-stranded RNA (+ssRNA) genomes. However, negative single-stranded RNA viruses and single-stranded DNA viruses have also been described. The updated 9th ICTV report on virus taxonomy lists over 90 mycovirus species covering 10 viral families, of which 20% were not assigned to a genus or, in some cases, not even to a family.

Isometric forms predominate mycoviral morphologies in comparison to rigid rods, flexuous rods, club-shaped particles, enveloped bacilliform particles, and Herpesvirus-like viruses. The lack of genomic data often hampers a conclusive assignment to already established groups of viruses or makes it impossible to erect new families and genera. The latter is true for many unencapsidated dsRNA viruses, which are assumed to be viral, but missing sequence data has prevented their classification so far. So far, viruses of the families Partitiviridae, Totiviridae, and Narnaviridae are dominating the "mycovirus sphere".

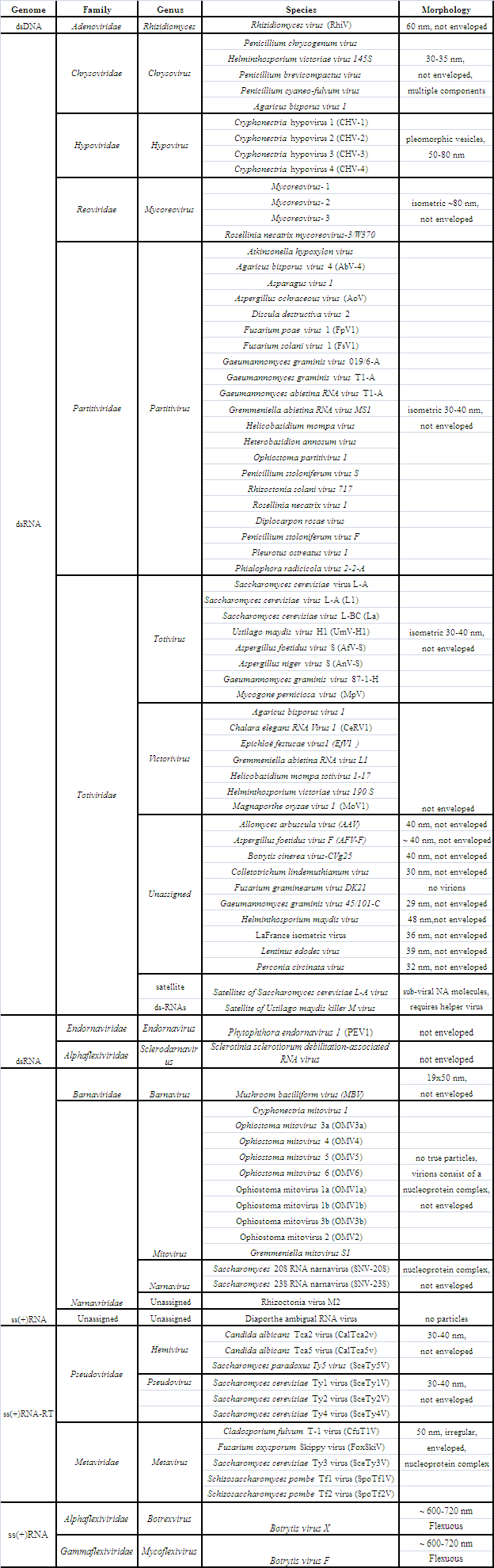
Listing of all formally named and recognised mycoviruses summarised from “Virus Taxonomy: The Ninth Report of the International Committee on Taxonomy of Viruses”

== Host range and incidence ==
Mycoviruses are common in fungi (Herrero et al., 2009) and are found in all four phyla of the true fungi: Chytridiomycota, Zygomycota, Ascomycota and Basidiomycota. Fungi are frequently infected with two or more unrelated viruses and also with defective dsRNA and/or satellite dsRNA. There are also viruses that simply use fungi as vectors and are distinct from mycoviruses because they cannot reproduce in the fungal cytoplasm.

It is generally assumed that the natural host range of mycoviruses is confined to closely related vegetability compatibility groups or VCGs which allow for cytoplasmic fusion, but some mycoviruses can replicate in taxonomically different fungal hosts. Good examples are mitoviruses found in the two fungal species S. homoeocarpa and Ophiostoma novo-ulmi. Nuss et al. (2005) described that it is possible to extend the natural host range of C. parasitica hypovirus 1 (CHV1) to several fungal species that are closely related to C. parasitica using in vitro virus transfection techniques. CHV1 can also propagate in the genera Endothia and Valsa, which belong to the two distinct families Cryphonectriaceae and Diaporthaceae, respectively. Furthermore, some human pathogenic fungi are also found to be naturally infected with mycoviruses, including AfuPmV-1 of Aspergillus fumigatus and TmPV1 of Talaromyces marneffei (formerly Penicillium marneffei).

In one study, forty patients with acute lymphoblastic leukemia were found to have antibodies to a mycovirus-containing Aspergillus flavus.In another research report, exposure of mononuclear cells from patients with acute lymphoblastic leukemia in full remission resulted in the re-development of the genetic and cell surface phenotypes characteristic of acute lymphoblastic leukemia.

== Origin and evolution ==
Viruses consisting of dsRNA as well as ssRNA are assumed to be very ancient and presumably originated from the "RNA world" as both types of RNA viruses infect bacteria as well as eukaryotes. Although the origin of viruses is still not well understood, recently presented data suggest that viruses may have invaded the emerging "supergroups" of eukaryotes from an ancestral pool during a very early stage of life on earth. According to Koonin, RNA viruses colonized eukaryotes first and subsequently co-evolved with their hosts. This concept fits well with the proposed "ancient co-evolution hypothesis", which also assumes a long co-evolution of viruses and fungi. The "ancient co-evolution hypothesis" could explain why mycoviruses are so diverse.

It has also been suggested that it is very likely that plant viruses containing a movement protein evolved from mycoviruses by introducing an extracellular phase into their life cycle rather than eliminating it. Furthermore, the recent discovery of an ssDNA mycovirus has tempted some researchers to suggest that RNA and DNA viruses might have common evolutionary mechanisms. However, there are many cases where mycoviruses are grouped together with plant viruses. For example, CHV1 showed phylogenetic relatedness to the ssRNA genus Potyvirus, and some ssRNA viruses, which were assumed to confer hypovirulence or debilitation, were often found to be more closely related to plant viruses than to other mycoviruses. Therefore, another theory arose that these viruses moved from a plant host to a plant pathogenic fungal host or vice versa. This "plant virus hypothesis" may not explain how mycoviruses developed originally, but it could help to understand how they evolved further.

== Transmission ==
A significant difference between the genomes of mycoviruses to other viruses is the absence of genes for ‘cell-to-cell movement’ proteins. It is therefore assumed that mycoviruses only move intercellularly during cell division (e.g. sporogenesis) or via hyphal fusion. Mycoviruses might simply not need an external route of infection as they have many means of transmission and spread due to their fungal host's life style:

- Plasmogamy and cytoplasmic exchange over extended periods of time
- Production of vast amounts of asexual spores
- Overwintering via sclerotia
- More or less effective transmission into sexual spores

However, there are potential barriers to mycovirus spread due to vegetative incompatibility and variable transmission to sexual spores. Transmission to sexually produced spores can range from 0% to 100% depending on the virus-host combination. Transmission between species of the same genus sharing the same habitat has also been reported including Cryphonectria (C. parasitica and C. sp), Sclerotinia (Sclerotinia sclerotiorum and S. minor), and Ophiostoma (O. ulmi and O. novo-ulmi). Intraspecies transmission has also been reported between Fusarium poae and black Aspergillus isolates. However, it is not known how fungi overcome the genetic barrier; whether there is some form of recognition process during physical contact or some other means of exchange, such as vectors. Research using Aspergillus species indicated that transmission efficiencies might depend on the hosts viral infection status (infected with no, different, or same virus), and that mycoviruses might play a role in the regulation of secondary mycoviral infection. Whether this is also true for other fungi is not yet known. In contrast to acquiring mycoviruses spontaneously, the loss of mycoviruses seems very infrequent and suggests that either viruses actively moved into spores and new hyphal tips, or the fungus might facilitate the mycoviral transport in some other way.

== Movement of mycoviruses within fungi ==
Although it is not known yet whether viral transport is an active or passive process, it is generally assumed that fungal viruses move forward by plasma streaming. Theoretically they could drift with the cytoplasm as it extends into new hyphae, or attach to the web of microtubuli, which would drag them through the internal cytoplasmic space. That might explain how they pass through septa and bypass woronin bodies. However, some researchers have found them located next to septum walls, which could imply that they ‘got stuck’ and were not able to move actively forward themselves. Others have suggested that the transmission of viral mitochondrial dsRNA may play an important role in the movement of mitoviruses found in Botrytis cinerea.

== Impact on host phenotype ==
Phenotypic effects of mycoviral infections can vary from advantageous to deleterious, but most of them are asymptomatic or cryptic. The connection between phenotype and mycovirus presence is not always straightforward. Several reasons may account for this. First, the lack of appropriate infectivity assays often hindered the researcher from reaching a coherent conclusion. Secondly, mixed infection or unknown numbers of infecting viruses make it very difficult to associate a particular phenotypic change with the investigated virus.

Although most mycoviruses often do not seem to disturb their host's fitness, this does not necessarily mean they are living unrecognized by their hosts. A neutral co-existence might just be the result of a long co-evolutionary process. Accordingly, symptoms may only appear when certain conditions of the virus-fungus-system change and get out of balance. This could be external (environmental) as well as internal (cytoplasmic). It is not known yet why some mycoviruses-fungus-combinations are typically detrimental while others are asymptomatic or even beneficial. Nevertheless, harmful effects of mycoviruses are economically interesting, especially if the fungal host is a phytopathogen and the mycovirus could be exploited as biocontrol agent. The best example is represented by the case of CHV1 and C. parasitica. Other examples of deleterious effects of mycoviruses are the ‘La France’ disease of A. bisporus and the mushroom diseases caused by Oyster mushroom spherical virus and Oyster mushroom isometric virus.

In summary, the main negative effects of mycoviruses are:

- Decreased growth rate
- Lack of sporulation
- Change of virulence
- Reduced germination of spores

Hypovirulent phenotypes do not appear to correlate with specific genome features and it seems there is not one particular metabolic pathway causing hypovirulence but several. In addition to negative effects, beneficial interactions do also occur. Well described examples are the killer phenotypes in yeasts and Ustilago. Killer isolates secrete proteins that are toxic to sensitive cells of the same or closely related species while the producing cells themselves are immune. Most of these toxins degrade the cell membrane. There are potentially interesting applications of killer isolates in medicine, food industry, and agriculture. A three-part system involving a mycovirus of an endophytic fungus (Curvularia protuberata) of the grass Dichanthelium lanuginosum has been described, which provides a thermal tolerance to the plant, enabling it to inhabit adverse environmental niches. In medically important fungi, an uncharacterized A78 virus of A. fumigatus causes mild hypervirulent effect on pathogenicity when tested on Galleria mellonella (Greater wax moth). Furthermore, TmPV1, a dsRNA partitivirus, of Talaromyces marneffei (formerly Penicillium marneffei) was found to cause hypervirulence phenotype on T. marneffei when tested on a mouse model. These could imply mycoviruses may play important roles in the pathogensis of human pathogenic fungi.

== Classification ==
Most fungal viruses belong to double-stranded RNA viruses, but about 30% belong to positive-strand RNA virus. However, negative single-stranded RNA viruses and single-stranded DNA viruses have also been described. The ninth edition of the report of the International Committee on Taxonomy of Viruses lists more than 90 fungal viruses belonging to 10 families, of which about 20% of the viruses have not been incertae sedis due to insufficient sequence data and have not yet been determined. The shape of most fungal viruses is isometric.
