= Heliophyte =

Plant adapted to strong solar radiation

Heliophytes or sunstroke plants are adapted to a habitat with a very intensive insolation by their structure and metabolism. Examples are mullein, ling, thyme and soft velcro, white clover, and most roses. They are common in open terrain, rocks, meadows, as well as at the mountain pastures and grasslands and other long sunny exposures.

Special features of such plants include coarse tiny leaves with hairy and waxy protection against excessive light radiation and water loss. In structure, the leaves vary in frequent double palisade layers. Chloroplasts have a protective element such as carotenoid and the enzymes, and accumulation of ROS to avoid toxic effects. In addition, there are also stomatal apparatuses on the leaves and green shoots, in order to allow a better exchange of gases. At same time, this increases possibilities for photosynthesis.

Unlike shade-preferring plants (sciophytes), heliophytes have a high light compensation point, and for this they need a higher illumination intensity for effective adoption of carbon dioxide. Sunstroke leaves, in this respect, have a very high capacity, to $30\mu molCO_2/m^2s$.

However, they have a higher basal metabolism comparing to the other leaves.

== See also ==
- Xerophyte
- Thermophyte
- Hydrophyte
- Halophyte
