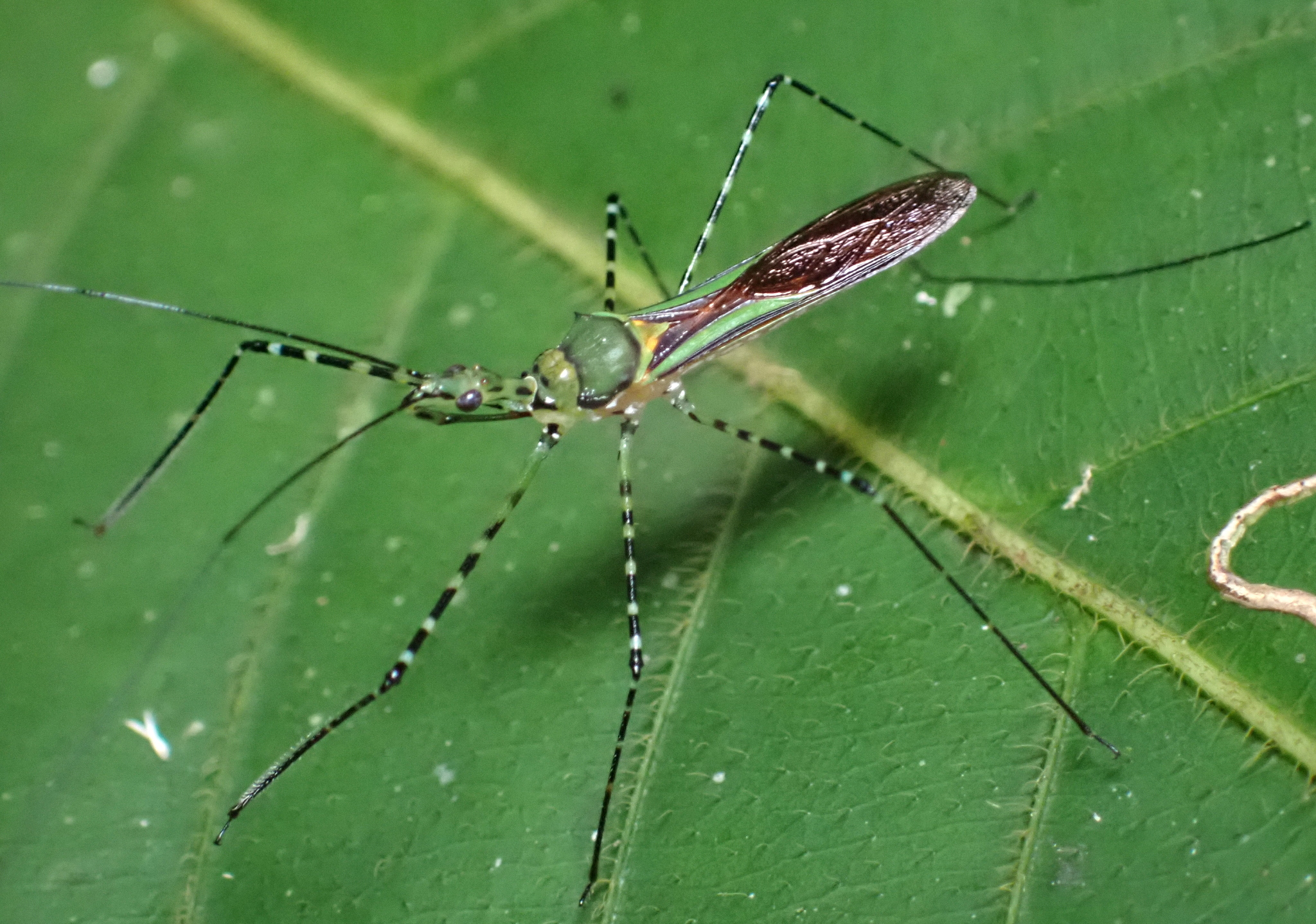

Scientific classification
- Kingdom: Animalia
- Phylum: Arthropoda
- Clade: Pancrustacea
- Class: Insecta
- Order: Hemiptera
- Suborder: Heteroptera
- Family: Reduviidae
- Genus: Zelus
- Species: Z. annulosus

Binomial name
- Zelus annulosus (Stål, 1866)

= Zelus annulosus =

Species of true bug

Zelus annulosus is an assassin bug found in South America. It frequently associates with Hirtella physophora (Chrysobalanaceae), a plant that houses colonies of plant-ants Allomerus decemarticulatus and provides the ants with nectar.

Some species of Zelus gather sticky substances from certain plants to coat their legs; Z. annulosus does not engage in this behavior, instead secreting the substance.

Zelus annulosus apparently is able to avoid being attacked by the ants by walking primarily on the plant's trichomes, which shield the assassin bug from the ants, but still allow Z. annulosus to be protected by having the ants in the vicinity.
