= Zelus araneiformis =

Scientific classification
- Kingdom: Animalia
- Phylum: Arthropoda
- Class: Insecta
- Order: Hemiptera
- Suborder: Heteroptera
- Family: Reduviidae
- Genus: Zelus
- Species: Z. araneiformis

Binomial name
- Zelus araneiformis Haviland, 1931

Species of true bug

Zelus araneiformis is a species of true bug in the subfamily Harpactorinae found in French Guiana. This species completes its development on Cecropia obtusa Aubl. (Urticaceae), which is unusual for predatory assassin bugs. Other species of Zelus use sticky resins to aid in prey capture.
