= Hirtella zanzibarica =

Conservation status
- Least Concern (IUCN 3.1)

Scientific classification
- Kingdom: Plantae
- Clade: Tracheophytes
- Clade: Angiosperms
- Clade: Eudicots
- Clade: Rosids
- Order: Malpighiales
- Family: Chrysobalanaceae
- Genus: Hirtella
- Species: H. zanzibarica

Binomial name
- Hirtella zanzibarica Oliv.

Species of plant

Hirtella zanzibarica is a species of flowering plant in the family Chrysobalanaceae. It occurs in eastern Africa from Kenya through Tanzania, and Malawi to Zambia and Mozambique.

The species was described by Daniel Oliver in 1876. Two subspecies are accepted.

- Hirtella zanzibarica subsp. megacarpa (R.A.Graham) Prance
- Hirtella zanzibarica subsp. zanzibarica
