= Zelus exsanguis =

Scientific classification
- Kingdom: Animalia
- Phylum: Arthropoda
- Clade: Pancrustacea
- Class: Insecta
- Order: Hemiptera
- Suborder: Heteroptera
- Family: Reduviidae
- Genus: Zelus
- Species: Z. exsanguis

Binomial name
- Zelus exsanguis Stål, 1862

Species of true bug

Zelus exsanguis is a species of insect.

== Description ==
13–16 mm long. Yellowish-brown to reddish-brown in color. Pronotum with sharp pronotal spines.

== Range ==
Mexico to Panama.
