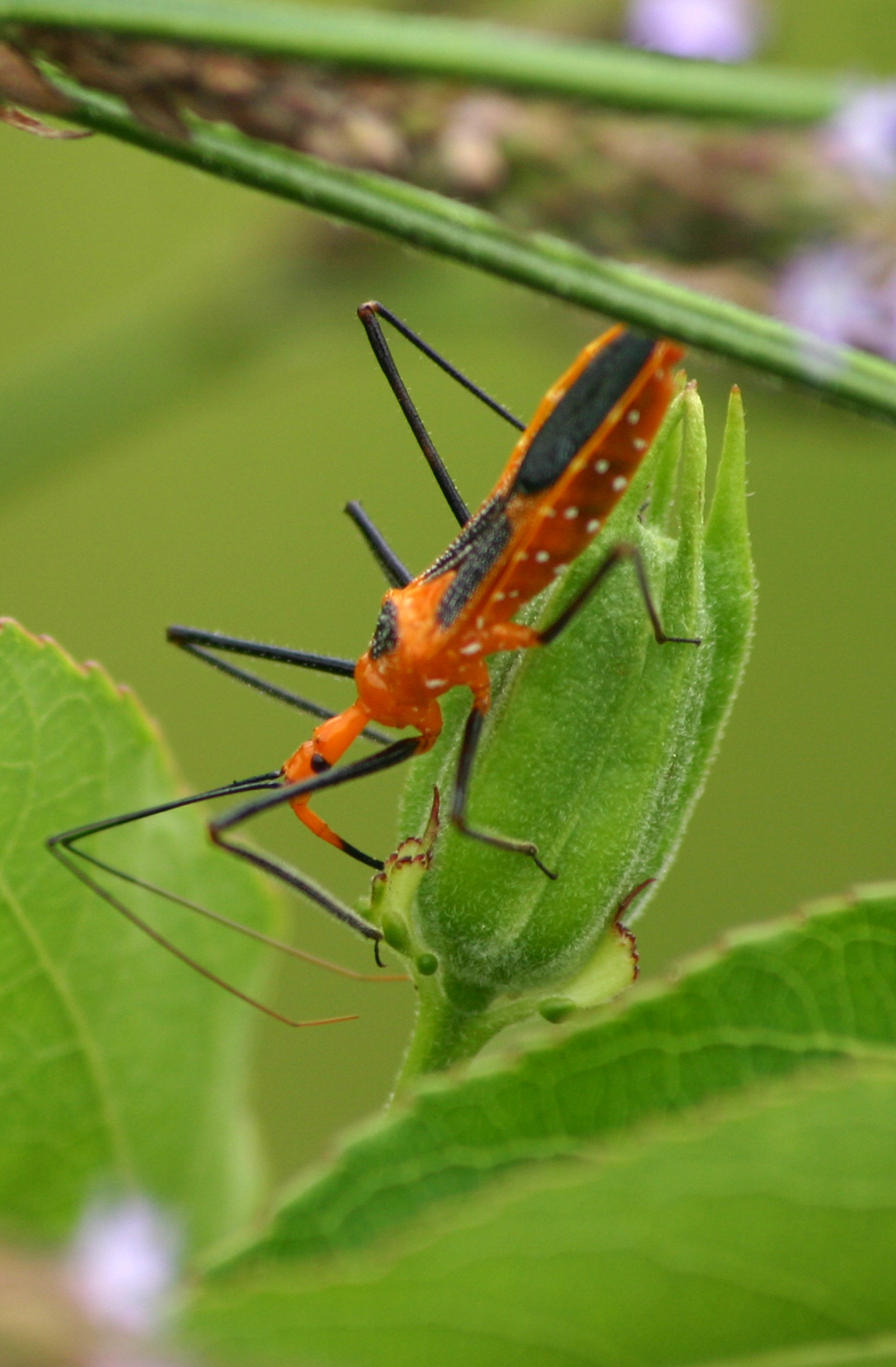
- Zelus bilobus feeding at an extrafloral nectary on maypop

Scientific classification
- Domain: Eukaryota
- Kingdom: Animalia
- Phylum: Arthropoda
- Class: Insecta
- Order: Hemiptera
- Suborder: Heteroptera
- Family: Reduviidae
- Genus: Zelus
- Species: Z. bilobus

Binomial name
- Zelus bilobus Say, 1832

= Zelus bilobus =

Species of true bug

Zelus bilobus is a species of assassin bug found in Florida.
