= Intralichen =

Scientific classification
- Kingdom: Fungi
- Division: Ascomycota
- Class: incertae sedis
- Order: incertae sedis
- Family: incertae sedis
- Genus: Intralichen; D.Hawksw. & M.S.Cole (2002)

Type species
- Intralichen christiansenii (D.Hawksw.) D.Hawksw. & M.S.Cole (2002)

Species
- I. baccisporus I. christiansenii I. lichenicola I. lichenum

Genus of fungi

Intralichen is a genus of lichenicolous fungi of uncertain classification in the class Ascomycota. It has four species. The genus was circumscribed by David Leslie Hawksworth and Mariette S. Cole in 2002, with Intralichen christiansenii as the type species.

== Species ==
- Intralichen baccisporus D.Hawksw. & M.S.Cole (2002)
- Intralichen christiansenii (D.Hawksw.) D.Hawksw. & M.S.Cole (2002)
- Intralichen lichenicola (M.S.Christ. & D.Hawksw.) D.Hawksw. & M.S.Cole (2002)
- Intralichen lichenum (Diederich) D.Hawksw. & M.S.Cole (2002)

== See also ==
- Bispora
- Trimmatostroma
