= Hirtella enneandra =

Conservation status
- Endangered (IUCN 3.1)

Scientific classification
- Kingdom: Plantae
- Clade: Tracheophytes
- Clade: Angiosperms
- Clade: Eudicots
- Clade: Rosids
- Order: Malpighiales
- Family: Chrysobalanaceae
- Genus: Hirtella
- Species: H. enneandra

Binomial name
- Hirtella enneandra Cuatrec.

Species of flowering plant

Hirtella enneandra is a species of plant in the family Chrysobalanaceae. It is endemic to Colombia.
