= Hirtella pauciflora =

Conservation status
- Endangered (IUCN 3.1)

Scientific classification
- Kingdom: Plantae
- Clade: Tracheophytes
- Clade: Angiosperms
- Clade: Eudicots
- Clade: Rosids
- Order: Malpighiales
- Family: Chrysobalanaceae
- Genus: Hirtella
- Species: H. pauciflora

Binomial name
- Hirtella pauciflora Little

Species of flowering plant

Hirtella pauciflora is a species of flowering plant in the family Chrysobalanaceae. It is endemic to Ecuador. Its natural habitat is subtropical or tropical moist lowland forests. The specific epithet pauciflora is Latin for 'few-flowered'.
