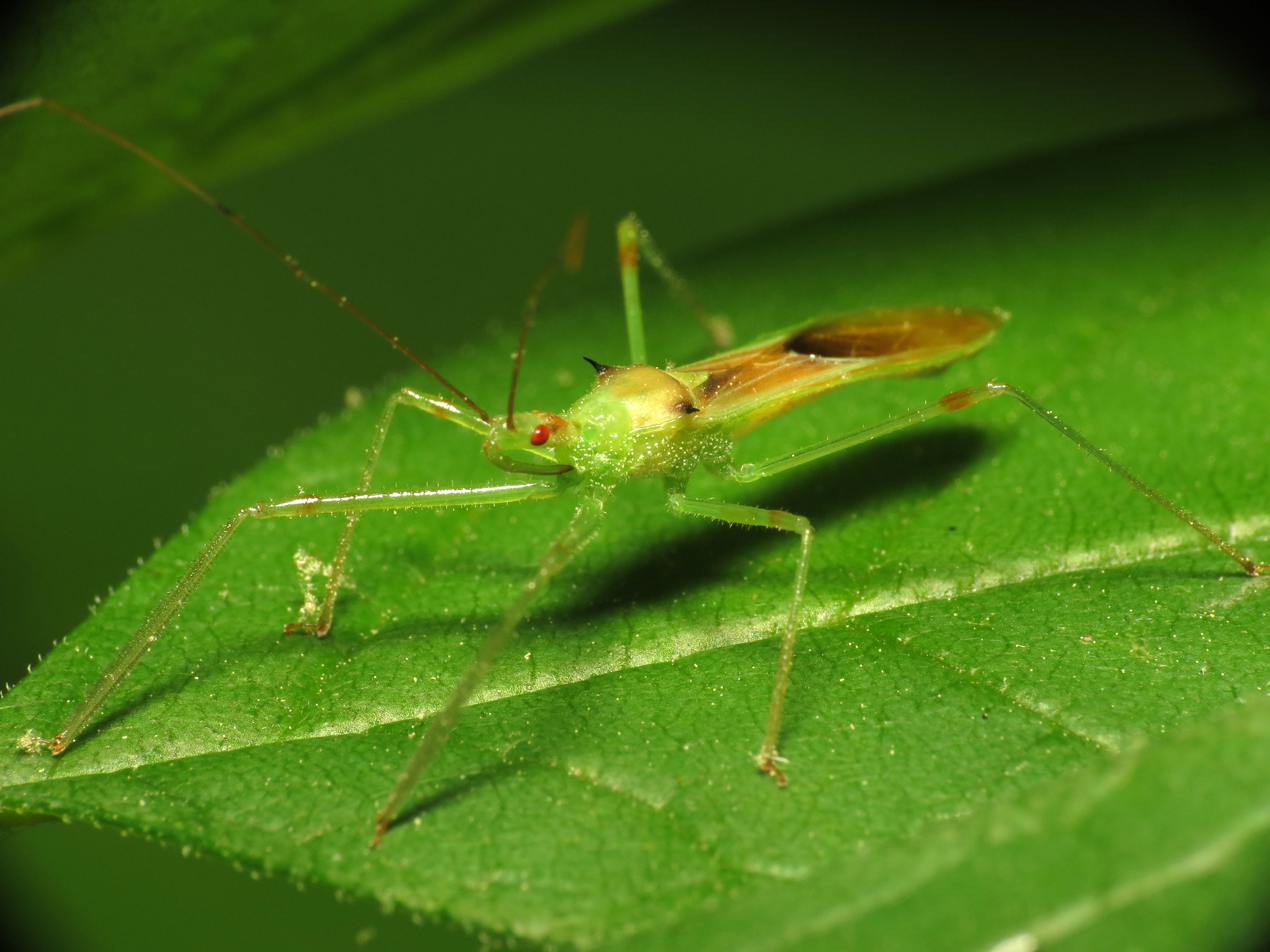
- Adult
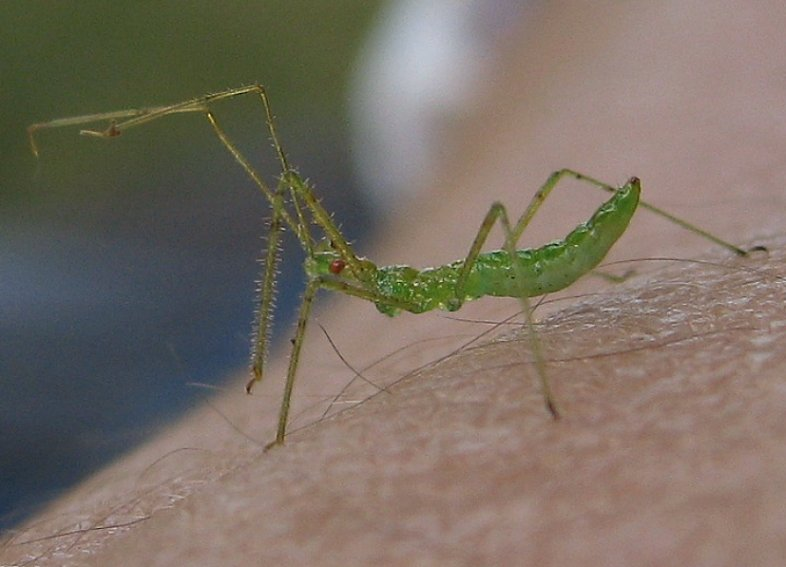
- Nymph

Scientific classification
- Kingdom: Animalia
- Phylum: Arthropoda
- Clade: Pancrustacea
- Class: Insecta
- Order: Hemiptera
- Suborder: Heteroptera
- Family: Reduviidae
- Genus: Zelus
- Species: Z. luridus

Binomial name
- Zelus luridus Stål, 1862

= Zelus luridus =

Species of true bug

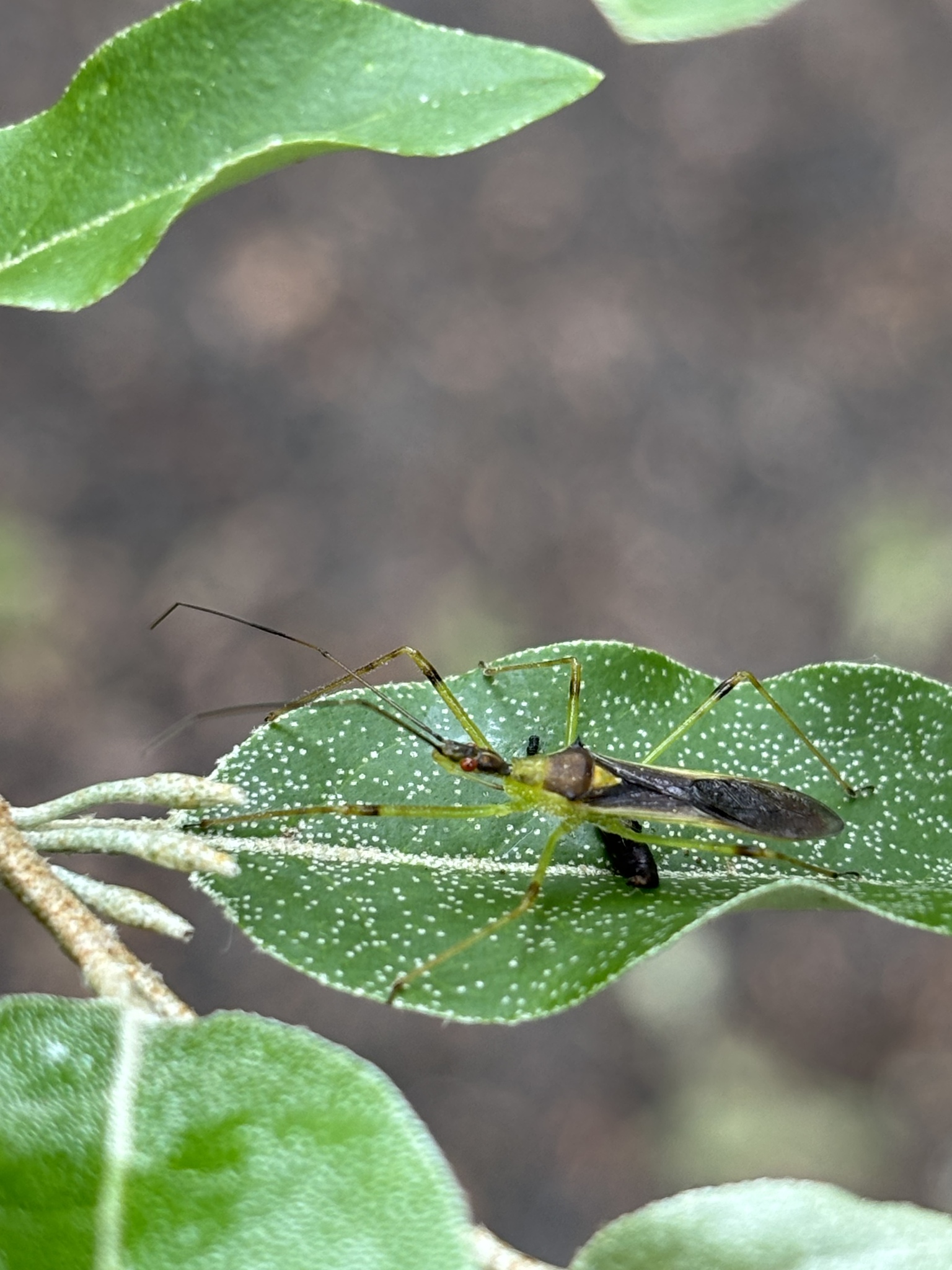
Dark-colored adult

Zelus luridus, also known as the pale green assassin bug, is a species of assassin bug native to North America. It is the most common Zelus species in the eastern United States. Although it may inflict a painful bite if handled, it is not considered medically significant to humans.

== Description ==
The size ranges from 12.5 to 18 millimetres (0.49 to 0.71 in) long. On average, adult females are 16 millimetres (0.63 in) long, while males are 14 millimetres (0.55 in) long. Though the base color is pale green, markings on the back can range from dark brown or red to bright yellow. Nymphs are generally more solid green, wingless, and with narrower bodies than adults. The most reliable feature to distinguish this species from others is the pair of spines on the rear corners of the pronotum. These spines are long on the lighter colored individuals and shorter on ones that are darker. It can also be distinguished by dark bands on the distal ends of the femurs, but these can often be too light to be easily seen. The egg masses, which are laid from late June to August, are conical in shape with a flat top. They are laid on leaves in groups of twenty to fifty and held together with a sticky, brownish material. Their bite is extremely painful.

== Biology ==
Like many other assassin bugs, Zelus luridus preys on other insects. It will often wait on leaves to ambush passing insects, but occasionally it also actively hunts. For this, it uses sticky traps, a common predation strategy to species within the genus Zelus. The sticky material is produced by a gland on the leg. This gland develops in the second instar. During the first instar, the nymphs use secretions deposited over the egg batch by the female as the source of their sticky material.

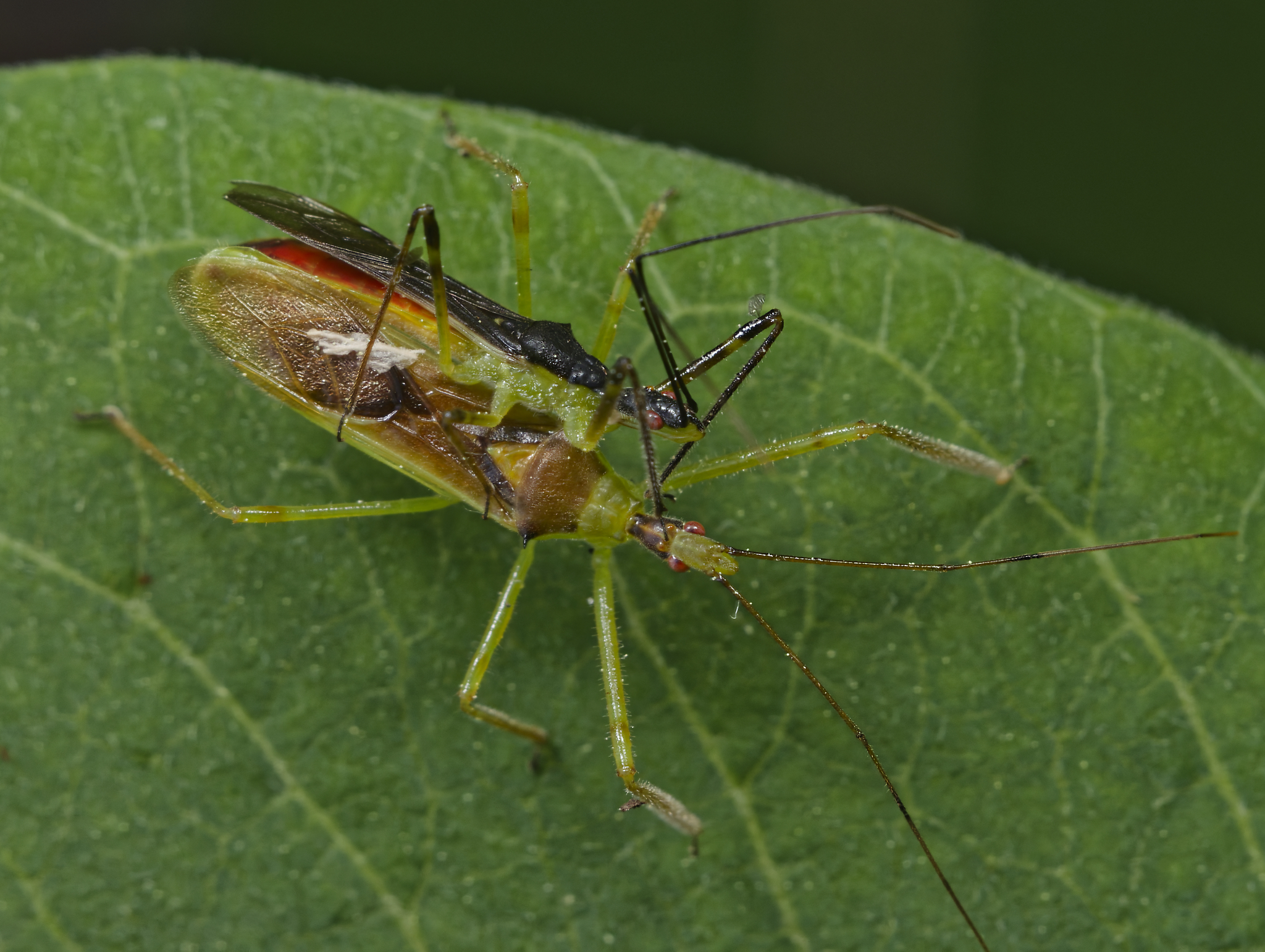
mating pair
