= Zelus longipes =

- Zelus longipes in Cuba

Scientific classification
- Kingdom: Animalia
- Phylum: Arthropoda
- Clade: Pancrustacea
- Class: Insecta
- Order: Hemiptera
- Suborder: Heteroptera
- Family: Reduviidae
- Genus: Zelus
- Species: Z. longipes

Binomial name
- Zelus longipes (Linnaeus, 1767)

Species of true bug

Zelus longipes is an assassin bug (Reduviidae) that is a member of the Harpactorinae subfamily. Its distribution ranges include southern North America, Central America, and South America (except Chile), especially in agroecosystems in Brazil.

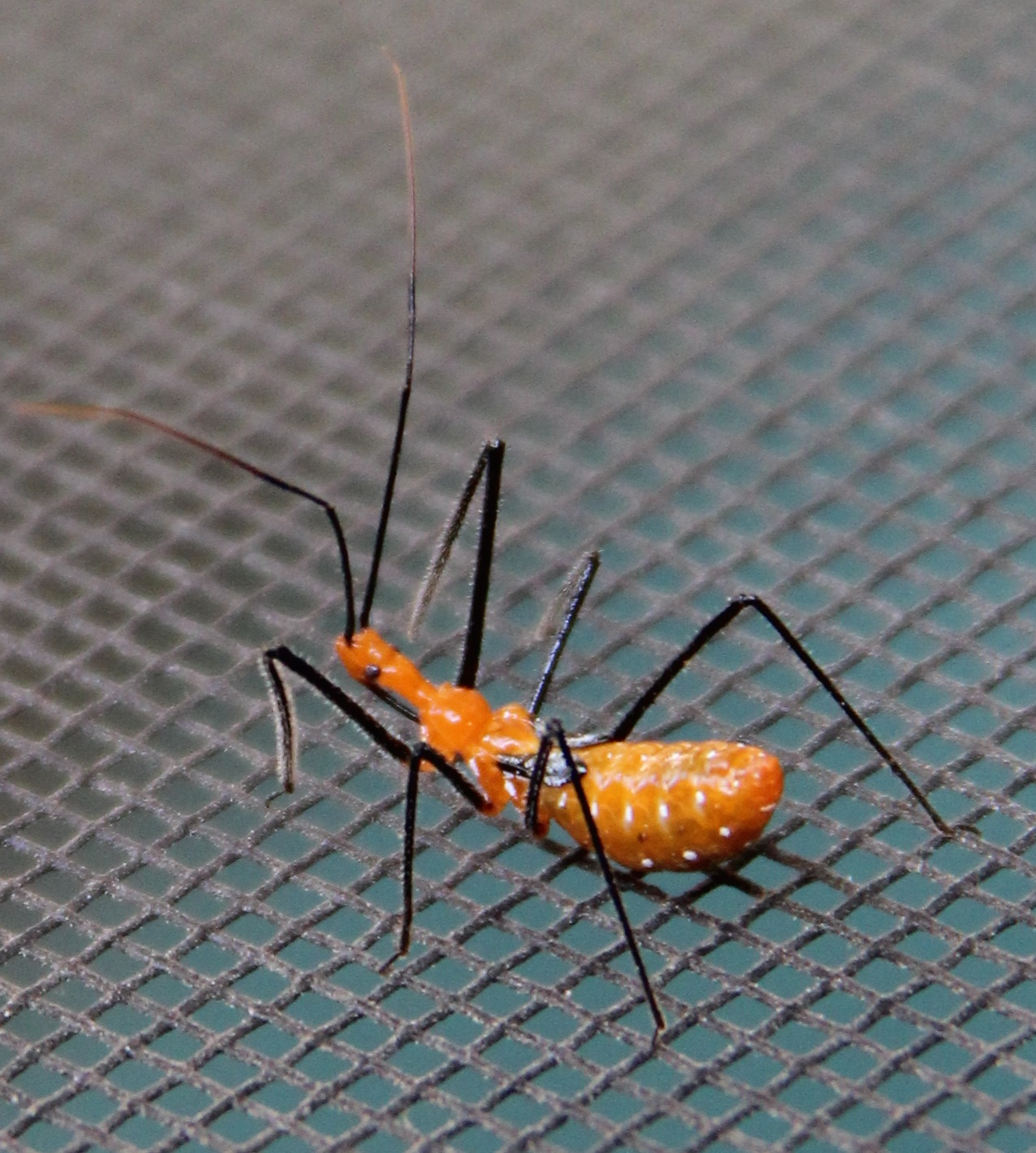
Nymph

Zelus longipes has been considered as a potential biocontrol agent, as it prefers caterpillars of Spodoptera frugiperda, which is a moth that is a pest in cornfields. The species is a generalist predator, commonly used to combat picture-winged flies (Diptera: Ulidiidae), which cause damage to sweet corn yields in Florida. Z. longipes prefers smaller caterpillars, probably because there is less risk of injury while subduing smaller prey.

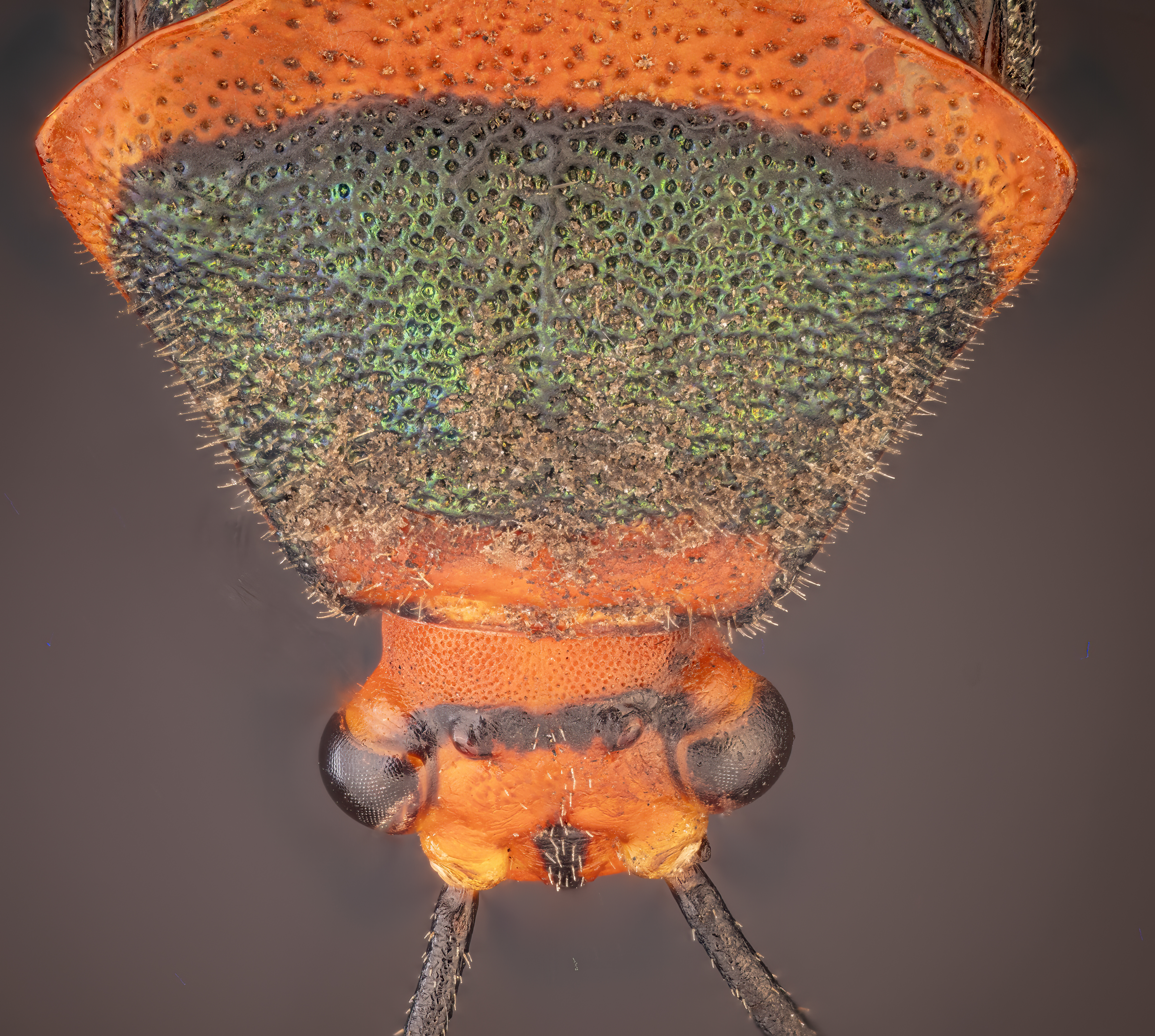
Head of Zelus longipes
