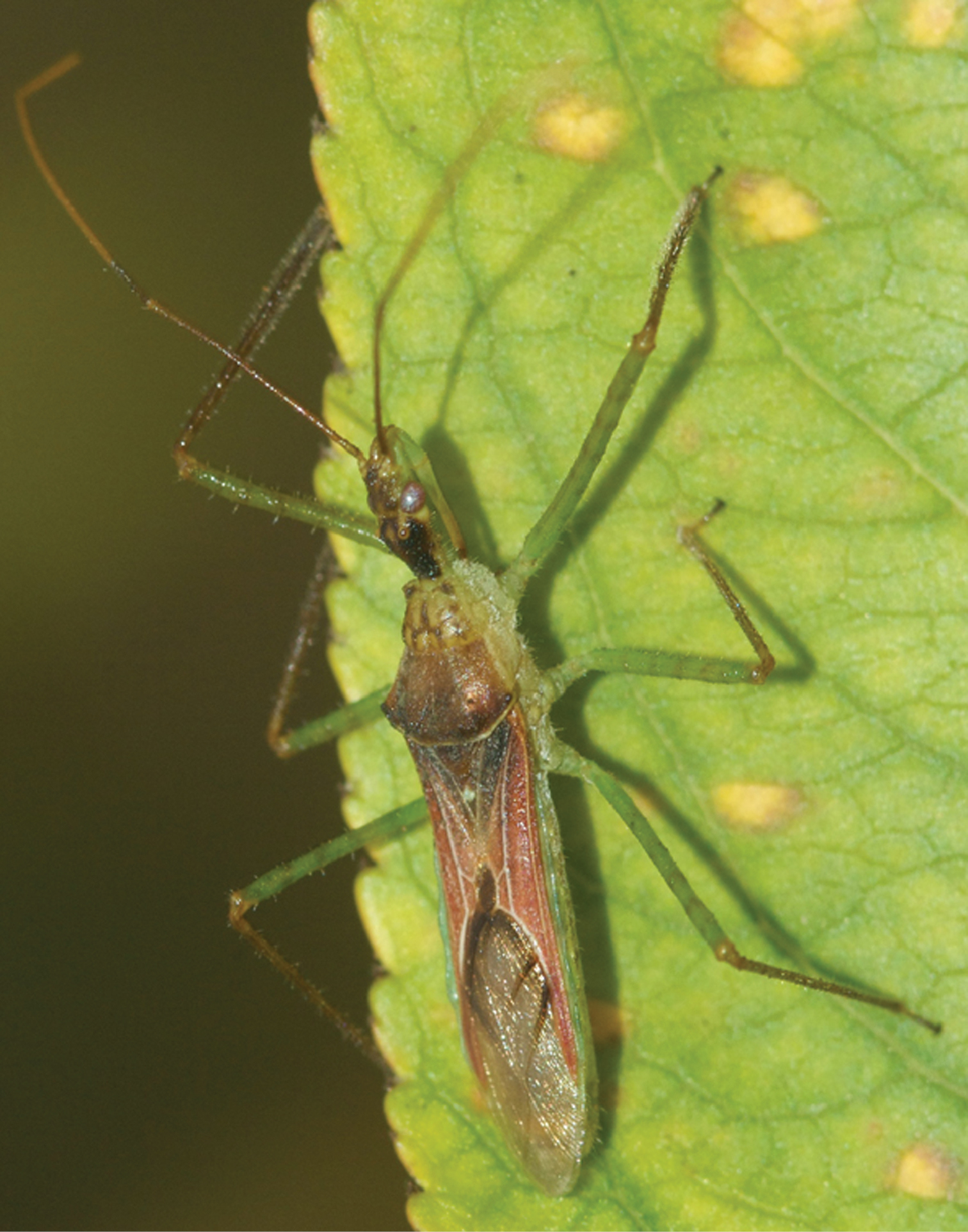
- Zelus renardii

Scientific classification
- Kingdom: Animalia
- Phylum: Arthropoda
- Class: Insecta
- Order: Hemiptera
- Suborder: Heteroptera
- Family: Reduviidae
- Subfamily: Harpactorinae
- Tribe: Harpactorini
- Genus: Zelus; Fabricus, 1803

Type species
- Cimex longipes Linnaeus, 1767

Species
- About 60, see text

Synonyms
- Diplodus Amyot & Serville, 1843 (Homonym); Pindus Stål, 1862

= Zelus (bug) =

Genus of insects

Zelus is a genus of insects in the family Reduviidae, the assassin bugs. There are currently 60 described species; most occur in Central and South America, and five are found in North America.

Some species have been investigated for their potential as biocontrol agents in integrated pest management. Zelus is also known for a sticky trap predation strategy. Sticky resin produced from a leg gland is smeared on hairs to aid in prey capture. This is somewhat analogous to the carnivorous plant sundew.

A 5 mm Zelus nymph on Hooker's evening primrose with a colony of aphids. Temperarure was about 48–50 °F (9–10 °C); this video is played at double speed.

5mm Zelus nymph, an assassin bug, grooming on Hooker's evening primrose.

Species include:

- Zelus annulosus
- Zelus araneiformis Haviland
- Zelus bilobus
- Zelus cervicalis
- Zelus exsanguis
- Zelus leucogrammus (Perty, 1833)
- Zelus longipes – milkweed assassin bug
- Zelus luridus Stål, 1862 – pale green assassin bug
- Zelus renardii – leafhopper assassin bug
- Zelus tetracanthus Stål, 1862
