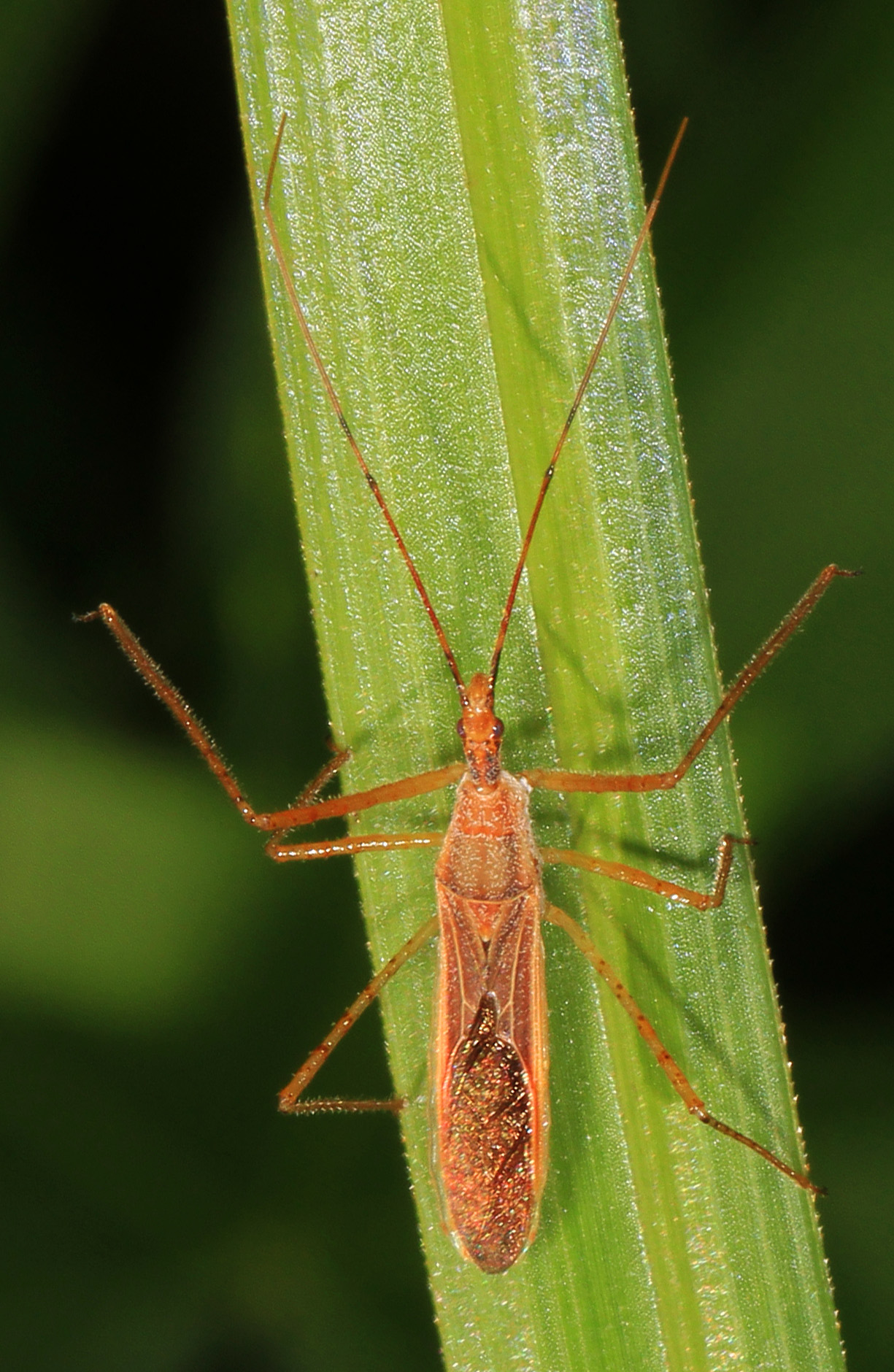

Scientific classification
- Domain: Eukaryota
- Kingdom: Animalia
- Phylum: Arthropoda
- Class: Insecta
- Order: Hemiptera
- Suborder: Heteroptera
- Family: Reduviidae
- Tribe: Harpactorini
- Genus: Zelus
- Species: Z. cervicalis

Binomial name
- Zelus cervicalis Stal, 1872

= Zelus cervicalis =

Species of true bug

Zelus cervicalis is a species of assassin bug in the family Reduviidae. It is found in Central America, North America, and South America.
