= Curvularia protuberata =

Scientific classification
- Kingdom: Fungi
- Division: Ascomycota
- Class: Dothideomycetes
- Order: Pleosporales
- Family: Pleosporaceae
- Genus: Curvularia
- Species: C. protuberata

Binomial name
- Curvularia protuberata Nelson 1965

Species of fungus

Curvularia protuberata is a species of fungus in the family Pleosporaceae. It forms a mutualistic relationship with Dichanthelium lanuginosum (panic grass) and Curvularia thermal tolerance virus that allows the grass to grow in soils that are far warmer than it normally tolerates. The mutualism allows the grass to thrive in soil that is 65 °C in Yellowstone National Park. Experiments have shown that the plant can only survive when it is infected by C. protuberata and when C. protuberata is also infected with the virus. This is an example of a tritrophic interaction, as three organisms are interacting.

== See also ==
- Marilyn J. Roossinck
