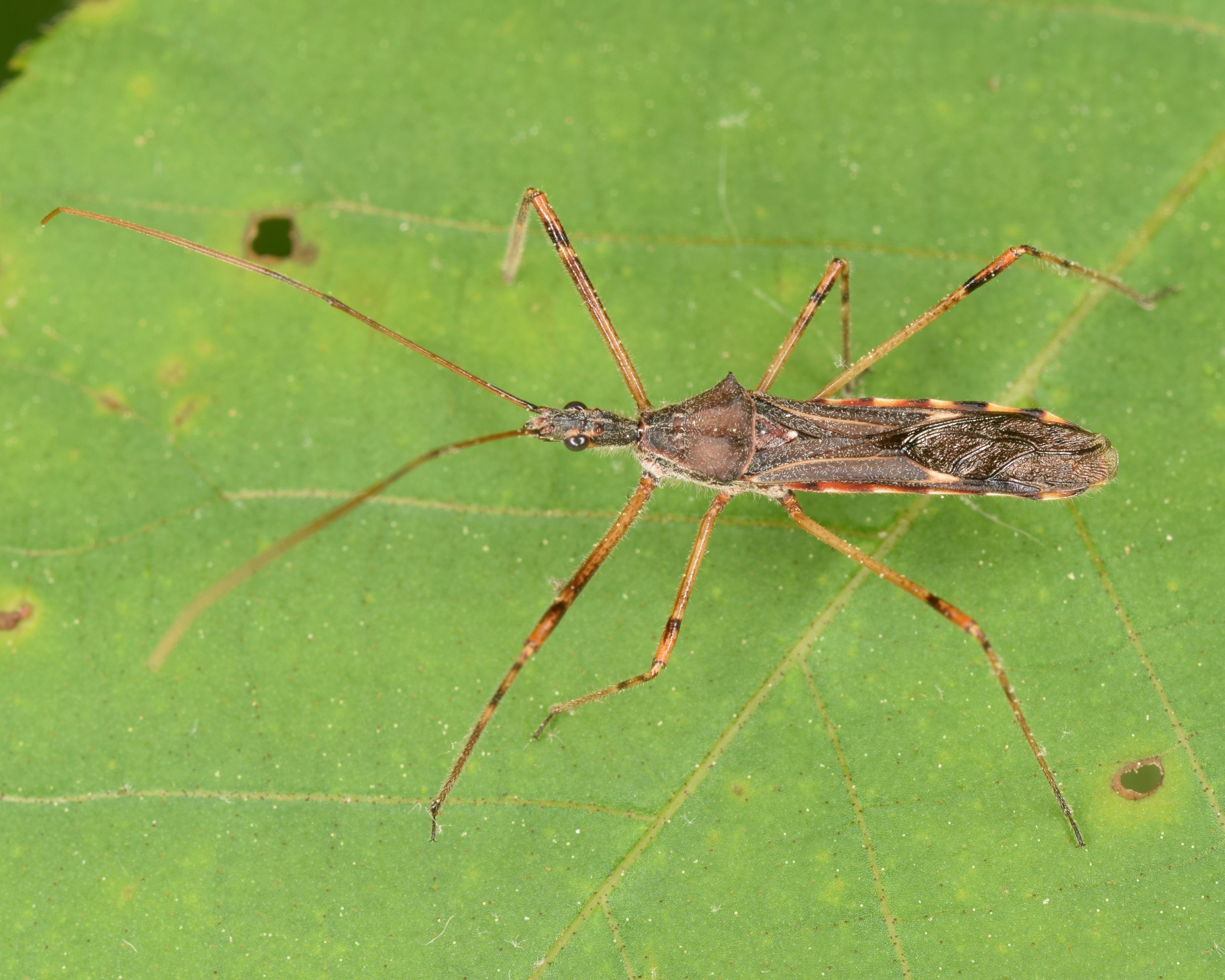

Scientific classification
- Domain: Eukaryota
- Kingdom: Animalia
- Phylum: Arthropoda
- Class: Insecta
- Order: Hemiptera
- Suborder: Heteroptera
- Family: Reduviidae
- Tribe: Harpactorini
- Genus: Zelus
- Species: Z. tetracanthus

Binomial name
- Zelus tetracanthus Stal, 1862

= Zelus tetracanthus =

Species of true bug

Zelus tetracanthus, the four-spurred assassin bug, is a species of assassin bug in the family Reduviidae. It is found in the Caribbean Sea, Central America, North America, and South America. Adults are brown, black, or gray and have a body length of 10–16 mm. Their antennae and legs are long and slender. They have a row of four spurs across their thorax. Both adults and nymphs use a sticky secretion to capture prey.
