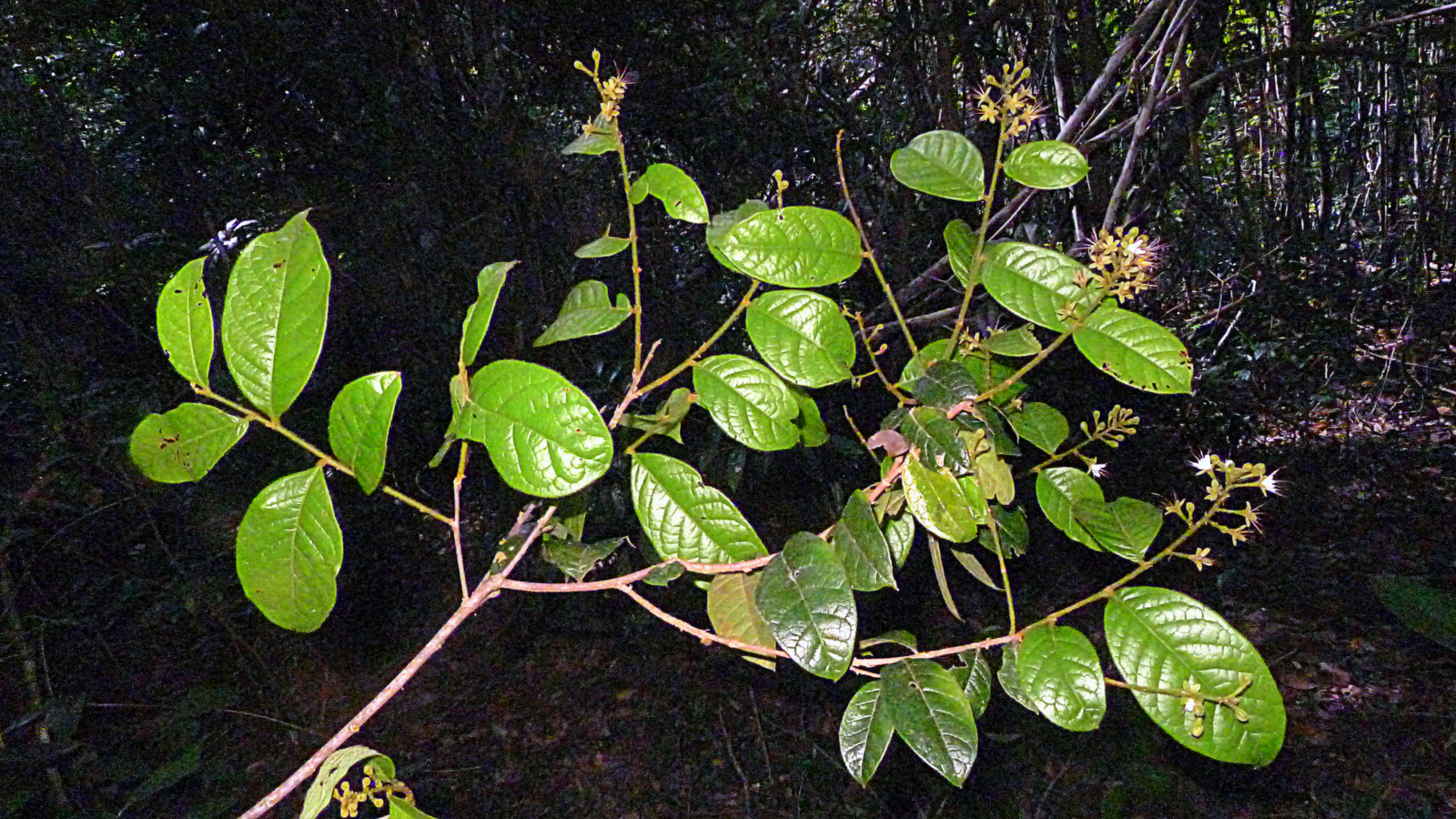
- Hirtella santosii, Bahia

Scientific classification
- Kingdom: Plantae
- Clade: Tracheophytes
- Clade: Angiosperms
- Clade: Eudicots
- Clade: Rosids
- Order: Malpighiales
- Family: Chrysobalanaceae
- Genus: Hirtella; L.

Type species
- Hirtella americana L.

Synonyms
- Tachibota Aubl.; Causea Scop.; Salmasia Schreb. 1789, illegitimate superfluous name, not Bubani 1873 (syn of Aira in Poaceae); Brya Vell. 1829, illegitimate homonym, not P. Browne 1756 (Fabaceae); Sphenista Raf.; Zamzela Raf.

= Hirtella =

Genus of plants

Hirtella is a genus of 110 species of woody trees in family Chrysobalanaceae. It was first described as a genus by Linnaeus in 1753. Hirtella naturally occurs in tropical forests throughout Latin America, the West Indies, southeast Africa, and Madagascar. The flowers are mainly pollinated by butterflies.

== Species ==
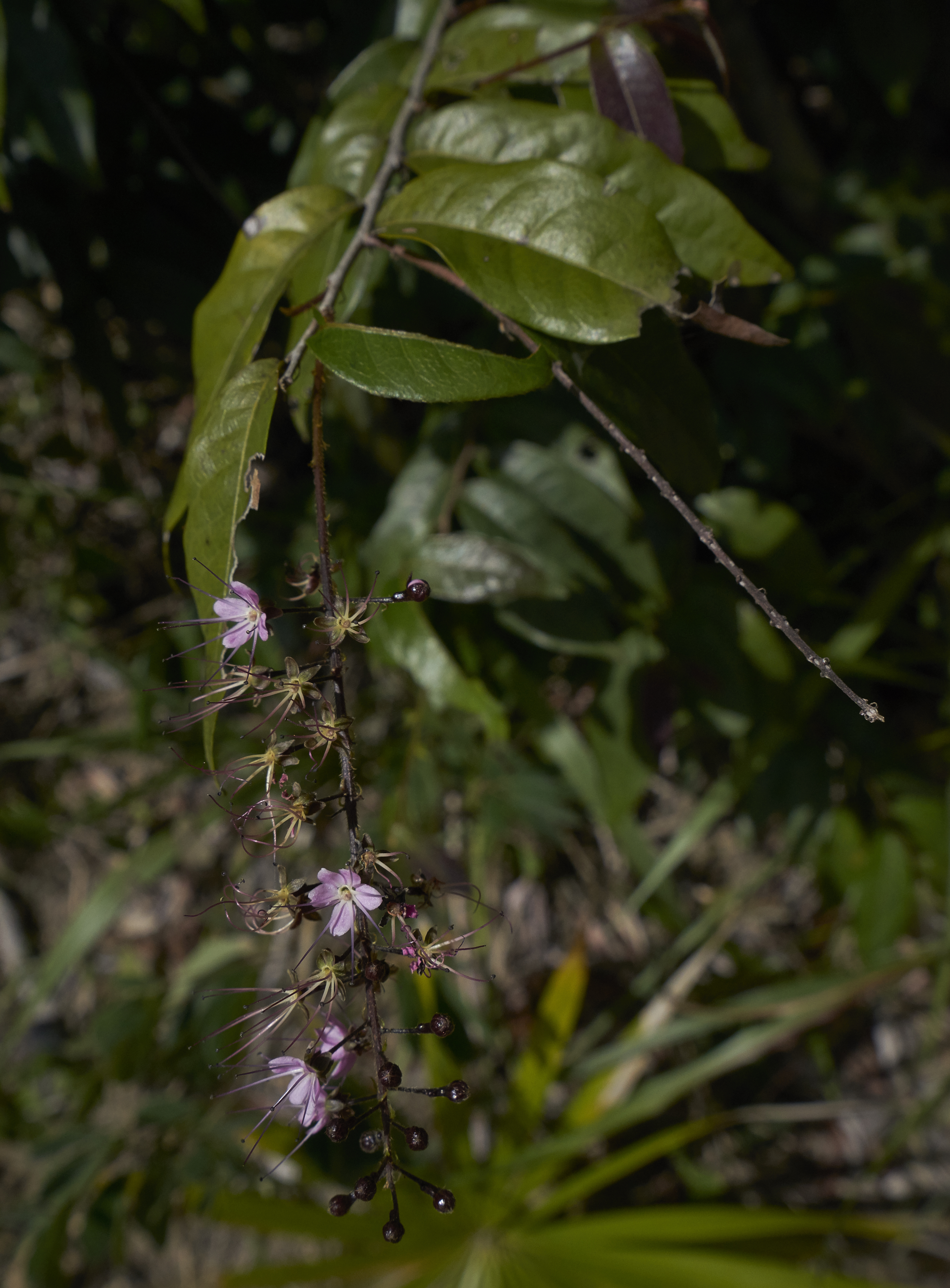
Hirtella racemosa, Belize

List of accepted species according to Kew:

1. Hirtella adderleyi - S Venezuela
2. Hirtella adenophora - Meta
3. Hirtella aequatoriensis - Ecuador
4. Hirtella americana - Guerrero to Ecuador; Cuba, Dom Rep
5. Hirtella angustifolia - Brazil
6. Hirtella angustissima - Guyana, Fr Guiana
7. Hirtella araguariensis - N Brazil, Fr Guiana
8. Hirtella aramangensis - N Peru
9. Hirtella arenosa - N Brazil
10. Hirtella bahiensis - Bahia, Espírito Santo
11. Hirtella barnebyi - Rondônia
12. Hirtella barrosoi - Rio de Janeiro
13. Hirtella beckii - Bolivia
14. Hirtella bicornis - trop South America
15. Hirtella brachystachys - SE Colombia, S Venezuela, NW Brazil
16. Hirtella bullata - N South America
17. Hirtella burchellii - Brazil, Peru, Bolivia
18. Hirtella caduca - Guyana, Bolívar
19. Hirtella carbonaria - S Colombia, N Ecuador
20. Hirtella castillana - SE Colombia, S Venezuela
21. Hirtella ciliata - Guyana, Fr Guiana, Brazil
22. Hirtella conduplicata - Amazonas B
23. Hirtella confertiflora - Amazonas V
24. Hirtella cordifolia - Amazonas V
25. Hirtella corymbosa - Bahia, Espírito Santo
26. Hirtella couepiiflora - Fr Guiana, Amapá
27. Hirtella cowanii - Amazonas V
28. Hirtella davisii - Costa Rica, Nicaragua, Venezuela, N Brazil, Fr Guiana, Guyana
29. Hirtella deflexa - S Venezuela
30. Hirtella dorvalii - N Brazil
31. Hirtella duckei - trop South America
32. Hirtella elongata - NW South America
33. Hirtella enneandra - Colombia
34. Hirtella eriandra - trop South America
35. Hirtella excelsa - W South America
36. Hirtella fasciculata - N Brazil
37. Hirtella floribunda - Minas Gerais
38. Hirtella glabrata - S Venezuela, N Brazil
39. Hirtella glandulistipula - Fr Guiana, N Brazil
40. Hirtella glandulosa - trop South America
41. Hirtella glaziovii - S Brazil
42. Hirtella gracilipes - trop South America
43. Hirtella guainiae - trop South America
44. Hirtella guatemalensis - Central America
45. Hirtella guyanensis - Venezuela, Guyana
46. Hirtella hebeclada - SE Brazil
47. Hirtella hispidula - trop South America
48. Hirtella hoehnei - Brazil
49. Hirtella insignis - Bahia, Espírito Santo
50. Hirtella juruenensis - Mato Grosso
51. Hirtella kuhlmannii - Mato Grosso, Pará
52. Hirtella lancifolia - Pará
53. Hirtella latifolia - Panama, Colombia, Ecuador
54. Hirtella lemsii - Costa Rica, Nicaragua, Honduras
55. Hirtella leonotis - N Colombia, N Venezuela
56. Hirtella liesneri - SE Colombia, S Venezuela
57. Hirtella lightioides - Peru, Bolivia
58. Hirtella longifolia - Amazonas B
59. Hirtella longipedicellata - N Brazil, S Venezuela
60. Hirtella macrophylla - trop South America
61. Hirtella macrosepala - E Venezuela, Guyana, Suriname
62. Hirtella magnifolia - SE Colombia, N Peru, N Brazil
63. Hirtella maguirei - Meta
64. Hirtella margae - Guyana, Suriname, Fr Guiana
65. Hirtella martiana - Brazil
66. Hirtella mucronata - Guyana, Suriname, N Brazil
67. Hirtella mutisii - Colombia, Ecuador, Peru
68. Hirtella myrmecophila - N Brazil
69. Hirtella obidensis - Guyana, Suriname, N Brazil
70. Hirtella orbicularis - Cerro Duida
71. Hirtella paniculata - St. Vincent, Trinidad, N South America
72. Hirtella papillata - Costa Rica, Honduras
73. Hirtella paraensis - NE Brazil
74. Hirtella parviunguis - Espírito Santo
75. Hirtella pauciflora - Ecuador
76. Hirtella pendula - Lesser Antilles
77. Hirtella physophora - N South America
78. Hirtella pilosissima - trop South America
79. Hirtella pimichina - S Venezuela, N Brazil
80. Hirtella piresii - trop South America
81. Hirtella punctillata - NE South America
82. Hirtella racemosa - Veracruz to Bolivia, Trinidad, Jamaica
83. Hirtella radamii - Roraima
84. Hirtella rasa - Peru, Acre
85. Hirtella revillae - N Peru
86. Hirtella rodriguesii - Loreto, NW Brazil
87. Hirtella rugosa - Puerto Rico, Dom Rep
88. Hirtella santosii - Bahia
89. Hirtella scaberula - Amazonas B
90. Hirtella scabra - N South America
91. Hirtella schultesii - NW South America
92. Hirtella silicea - NE South America, Trinidad
93. Hirtella sprucei - Brazil
94. Hirtella standleyi - Loreto
95. Hirtella subglanduligera - Acre
96. Hirtella subscandens - S Venezuela, N Brazil
97. Hirtella suffulta - N Brazil, Fr Guiana
98. Hirtella tentaculata - NE South America
99. Hirtella tenuifolia - N Brazil, Fr Guiana, Suriname
100. Hirtella thouarsiana - Madagascar
101. Hirtella tocantina - N Brazil, Peru, Bolivia
102. Hirtella triandra - West Indies; C Mexico to Bolivia
103. Hirtella trichotoma - Costa Rica
104. Hirtella tubiflora - Costa Rica to Ecuador
105. Hirtella ulei - SE Colombia, S Venezuela, N Brazil
106. Hirtella vesiculosa - SE Colombia
107. Hirtella zanzibarica - Kenya, Tanzania, Mozambique, Malawi, Zambia
