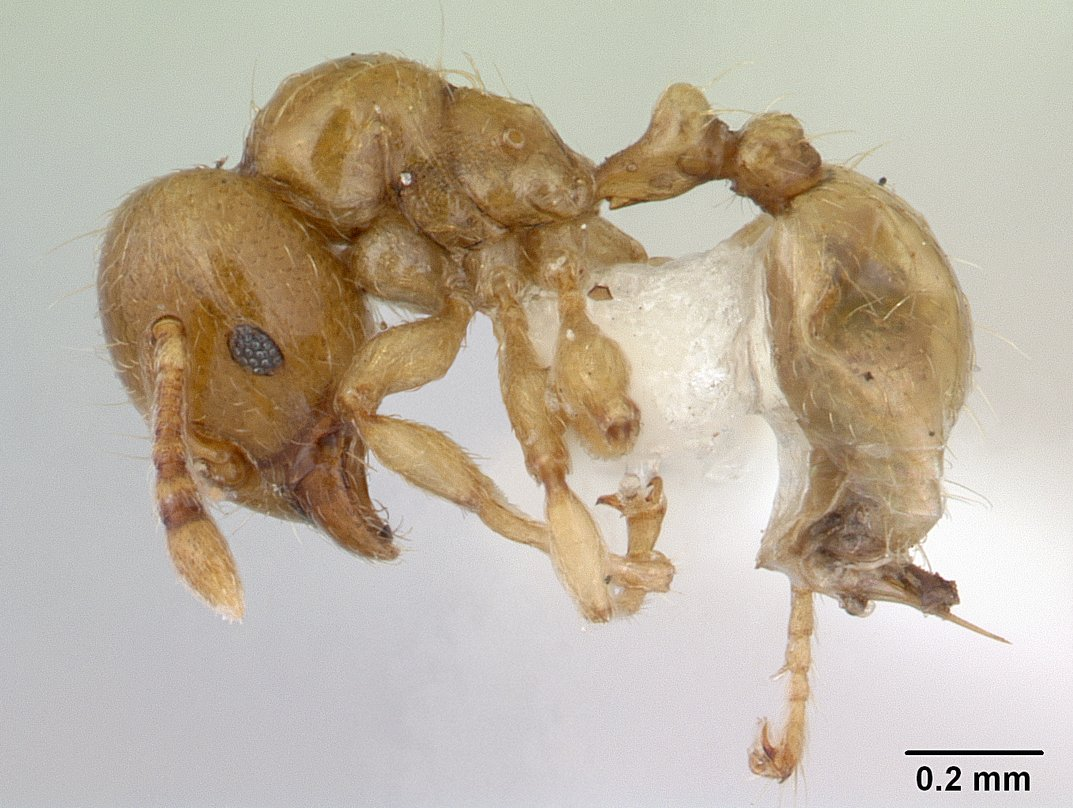

Scientific classification
- Kingdom: Animalia
- Phylum: Arthropoda
- Clade: Pancrustacea
- Class: Insecta
- Order: Hymenoptera
- Family: Formicidae
- Subfamily: Myrmicinae
- Genus: Allomerus
- Species: A. decemarticulatus

Binomial name
- Allomerus decemarticulatus Mayr, 1878

= Allomerus decemarticulatus =

Species of ant

Allomerus decemarticulatus is an Amazonian ant species found in the tropics of South America. This species is most notable for the workers' complex and extreme predatory behavior, which involves a symbiosis with both a plant and fungal species. They live in leaf pockets of a host plant species, Hirtella physophora. These leaf pockets are areas inside of the plant between the leaves and the stem. Each colony, which consists of about 1,200 workers, inhabits a single tree; however, the ants are spread among the leaf pockets, with typically 40 workers per pocket. Their diet primarily consists of large insects that are captured on the plant, but they also eat some kinds of food bodies produced by the plant as well as its nectar. They are able to capture their prey, which is much larger than themselves, by constructing a platform that acts as a trap for the unsuspecting prey. The ants hide in the trap and attack when any insect lands on it. This technique is an example of ambush predation.

== Physical characteristics ==
The worker is about 2 mm long, with a head width and length at about 0.6 mm. The queen is approximately double that size, with a head width of 1.05 mm, head length of 0.98 mm, and a total length of 5.53 mm. The workers have 10-segmented antennae, from where they get their name. They also have abundant hair, with long hairs on their head (greater than 0.13 mm) and shorter hairs on their abdomen (less than 0.07 mm). They have brownish yellow colored bodies and whitish hair.

== Habitat ==
A. decemarticulatus is a Neotropical species that lives in the Amazonian tropics of South America. The species lives in H. physophora, whose range is limited to Brazil and French Guiana. They live and hunt on H. physophora, living in leaf pouches and patrolling the plant's stem for prey.

== Plant mutualism ==
The relationship between A. decemarticulatus and H. physophora is very specialized. H. physophora is a small tree in the Amazonian rainforest that resides in the undergrowth. It is also an example of a myrmecophyte, because it contains ant-domatia, leaf pouches and hollow chambers where the ants nest permanently. These leaf pouches occur when the edge of a leaf adjacent to the petiole curls under. The result is two hollow spheres on both sides of the stem of the leaf. The ants live inside of these domatia. There is only one colony per tree, but that colony divides up into many different domatia. Also located in the leaf pouches are extrafloral nectaries, which provide the ants with nectar made by the plant, and also some food bodies that provide the ants with further nutrition as they mature to become foragers and insect predators. This is the first known instance of extrafloral nectaries being observed inside of ant-domatia.

So far this looks like simple parasitism by the ants, as if they simply take advantage of the plant for food and shelter. However, the plant also benefits greatly from this relationship. With the help of their traps and predation, the ants defend the plant from other insects and parasitic plants. Any insect that may kill or eat the plant is quickly captured and killed by the ants, which is also to their own benefit.

The specialized structures of the plant reveal a very interesting coevolution and symbiosis between these two species. A recent study performed by Céline Leroy et al. (2008) revealed many characteristics that the plant has adapted to support the ants. First, the domatia are located next to the stems that the ants use for hunting. Second, they contain extrafloral nectaries and food bodies to feed the ants if they do not have other sources of food. Third, there are less chloroplasts found inside of the domatia, which means that it has a lower photosynthetic capacity. Fourth, stomata were found inside of the domatia, although at a lower density, possibly to capture the carbon dioxide from the ants' respiration taking place inside. Finally, there was a greater deposit of cellulose found in the domatia, which would result in a thicker cell wall and a more rigid surface to support the weight of the ants. These findings show that the areas destined to become domatia are inherited and a result of coevolution; they were solely produced to support this specific species of ant.

== Fungal symbiosis ==
There are many different species of fungus that grow alongside the domatia where the ants live. In fact, when the founding queen first starts laying eggs in the domatia of a new H. physophora, the hyphae of multiple different species of fungi will entirely cover the entrance to the domatia. When the worker ants mature, they actually have to dig their way through the fungal covering to get to the outside of the plant. However, almost even more remarkably, out of all of these fungal species, A. decemarticulatus will only cultivate one specific species. This fungus is a sooty mold which, according to one study by Mario X. Ruiz-Gonzalez et al. (2010), is characterized by closely related haplotypes (genetic markers) in the order Chaetothyriales. The ants use this mold to construct their traps.

Another noteworthy observation is that, unlike typical mutualisms between ants and fungus, these ants do not receive any nutrition from the fungus. They strictly manipulate the physiology of the fungus to construct a mortar for a trap that is able to catch much larger prey.

== Trap-making ==
Manufacturing this trap is an incredible act in itself. The workers construct the traps on the stems of the plant, basically by making a raised and hollow platform on one section of the stem. The structure itself simply looks like a part of the plant, as if it grew in width slightly. The ants will also make small holes in this platform which are slightly wider than their own bodies. The individual workers will hide in these holes underneath the surface, invisible to their prey from the outside. They will position their heads outwards from the plant with mandibles open, waiting for prey.

The actual production of the trap occurs by first cutting plant hairs (trichomes) from a narrow vertical stretch of the stem outside of the domatia. The ants will then arrange these hairs to outline the structure of the trap and regurgitate the mold that acts as a paste and holds the trichomes together. They use their fungal relationship to gather this mold, by collecting the mycelium from the fungus grown on the plant. This mold will continue to grow in between the trichomes and around the holes to fill out and reinforce the structure.

== Predatory behavior ==
Normally, there are only a small number of ants in any given area on the plant stem. There are about 40 workers per leaf, but generally only a few will be patrolling outside. Once an insect lands on the plant, the closest ant will immediately surface and grab on to a leg, antenna, wing, or some other appendage of the prey. This ant will pull the prey, which will try to escape by pulling in the opposite direction. However, the ant will rarely let go of its grip. The ant immobilizes the prey and, using an extreme feat of strength, will hold the much larger prey to the plant as more ants from around that area arrive. This ability to hold the prey is extremely important because the ants move and congregate fairly slowly.

After the first ant has immobilized the prey, it releases pheromones to call other ants to the area. The first few ants to arrive will each grab a different leg and pull in opposite directions, "spread-eagling" the prey. Anywhere between six and 16 ants will participate in this spread-eagling. As the prey lies motionless and helpless, worker ants will congregate and either help to hold the prey down, if that is necessary, or start stinging and biting it. In doing this, they use a venom that they produce to paralyze and kill the prey. Afterwards, the group of workers will carry the body back to the colony, where it is dismembered and cut up into little pieces to be eaten by the group.

This predatory behavior is a great example of a collaboration between solitary and cooperative predation. The first ant will initially act alone in her predation, but after that other ants will come and join in the hunt, and still other will travel back to the domatia to recruit even more ants to aid in holding down and eventually dismembering the prey. This also demonstrates how much more effective a group of individuals can be than an individual working on its own. A single ant would never be able to kill such large prey; they are only able to do so by incorporating communication and cooperation.

This predatory behavior is very effective against the relatively large prey that the ants consume. Dejean and other researchers (2001) tested the limits of its effectiveness by exposing the ants to termites and grasshoppers, which are about 40 and 142.2 times the size of the worker ants, respectively. So a single Allomerus decemarticulatus worker restraining a grasshopper is about the equivalence of a 175-pound person holding down a struggling 25,000 pound object that is actively trying to escape. When the termites were exposed, each was captured by the ants; none got away. However, with grasshoppers, all were seized by at least one leg, but out of the 20 introduced, five were captured completely, 12 escaped but lost their leg that was clasped on to by the worker, and seven jumped away.

Any prey that has the ability to jump or fly away will always be more effective in escaping than non-flying insects like the termites. However, many times those that do escape will still lose a leg or other appendage in the process, like 60% of the grasshoppers in this experiment. Because the prey is so much larger than the ants, even just getting this one appendage as a food source is a victory. For example, a hind leg of a grasshopper is still about 12.4 times the size of a single ant and a great resource in itself.

== Other animal interactions ==
If the multiple relationships of A. decemarticulatus were not complex enough, they also commonly interact with an assassin bug, Zelus annulosus, which often resides on H. physophora plants. However, these bugs have adapted physiological and behavioral characteristics that allow them to avoid the predation of A. decemarticulatus, while also maintaining a mutualistic relationship with the plant.

Similar to the ants, Z. annulosus normally lives on younger H. physophora individuals, where the females lay eggs on the stem. As they begin to develop, the young bugs will live among the trichomes of the stem and hunt on the leaves of the plant. The relationship between the assassin bug and the plant acts independently from that between the ants and the plant. One difference between the two relationships, however, is that the assassin bugs do not take any food source from the plant like the ants do.

Z. annulosus has basically adapted to live and hunt around A. decemarticulatus. The assassin bug species uses this particular plant to raise their nymphs because the trichomes of the plant deter larger ant species that may kill the young developing bugs. Also, the bugs secrete a sticky substance that allows them to walk on top of these trichomes, thus avoiding the traps of A. decemarticulatus. So in the relationship between Z. annulosus and H. physophora, the bug receives shelter from potential large predator ants, and the plant received a second line of defense against herbivores. The assassin bug also cohabitates the plant peacefully with the ants. They hunt in similar areas on the plant, but the assassin bugs are suspected to actively avoid any of the ants because they are much quicker than the ants.

== Relevance to sociobiology ==
By simply observing the stem of one H. physophora individual, we see the complex interactions between four different species: an ant, a plant, a fungus, and an assassin bug, as well as all of the prey that lands on the plant. The plant gives a little of its own resources to the predators, but it gets two forms of defense against herbivores and parasitic plants. To the plant, this defense is worth much more than the loss of some food. The plant has maximized its own fitness by establishing two separate and independent relationships that are not very costly but very rewarding. The insects both benefit as well, given a safe habitat and a steady food supply of other insects that land on the prey. In the perspective of A. decemarticulatus, they do not actively give any of their own resources to the plant or to the assassin bug. They simply live among them, use their resources, and hunt.

In regards to the predatory behavior of A. decemarticulatus, similar behaviors have been observed in other ant species, such as symbioses with plants (like in Pseudomyrmex ferruginea), cultivating a fungus (like in leafcutter ants), and sneaking up to and ambushing larger prey (like in Azteca andreae, another species studied by Dejean). However, most remarkably, Allomerus decemarticulatus seems to incorporate each of these advanced behaviors to make a powerful apparatus for tricking impressively large prey.
