= Hirtella physophora =

Conservation status
- Least Concern (IUCN 3.1)

Scientific classification
- Kingdom: Plantae
- Clade: Tracheophytes
- Clade: Angiosperms
- Clade: Eudicots
- Clade: Rosids
- Order: Malpighiales
- Family: Chrysobalanaceae
- Genus: Hirtella
- Species: H. physophora

Binomial name
- Hirtella physophora Mart. & Zucc.

Synonyms
- Hirtella cauliflora Huber; Hirtella cotticaensis Kleinhoonte

Species of flowering plant

Hirtella physophora is a species of plant in the family Chrysobalanaceae. It is a tree native to northern tropical South America, including northern Brazil, Colombia, the Guianas, Peru, and Venezuela, where it grows in lowland tropical rain forest. It forms an association with the ant species, Allomerus decemarticulatus. The ants live in honeycombed cylinders they attach to the plant's stems. The plant nearly always has these ants associated with it.
