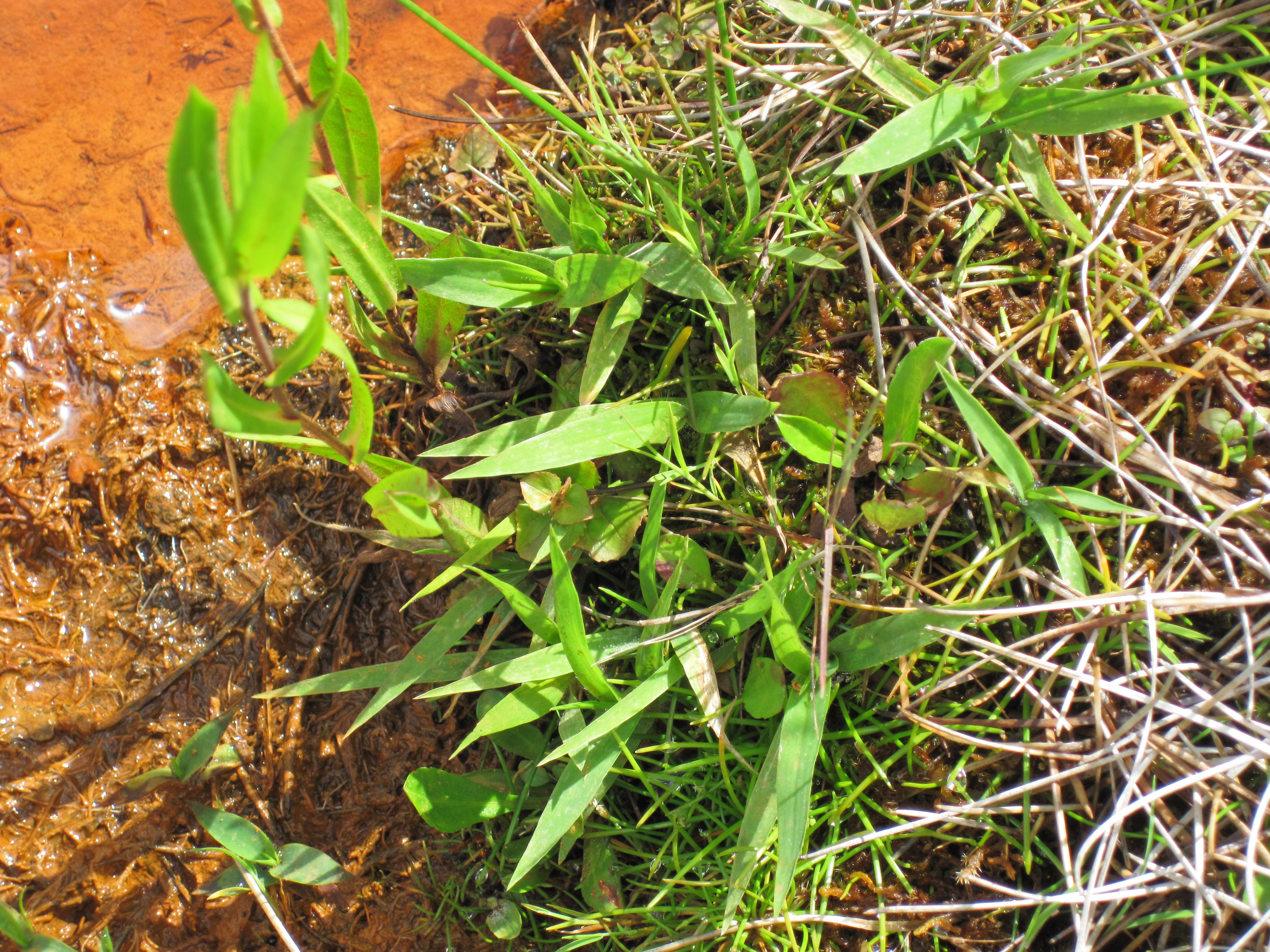
- In Gibbon Geyser Basin, Yellowstone N.P.

Scientific classification
- Kingdom: Plantae
- Clade: Embryophytes
- Clade: Tracheophytes
- Clade: Spermatophytes
- Clade: Angiosperms
- Clade: Monocots
- Clade: Commelinids
- Order: Poales
- Family: Poaceae
- Subfamily: Panicoideae
- Genus: Dichanthelium
- Species: D. lanuginosum

Binomial name
- Dichanthelium lanuginosum (Ell.) Gould

= Dichanthelium lanuginosum =

Species of grass

Dichanthelium lanuginosum is a species of rosette grass native to North America. It is most common in the central and eastern United States. It is found in a variety of habitats, mostly in open, dry areas.

A variety, D. lanuginosum var. thermale, grows in geothermal areas of Yellowstone National Park, United States. It is able to withstand high temperatures and high acidity in its rhizosphere. In 2007 it was found that the heat tolerance is conferred to the grass by a symbiosis between a fungus and a virus. When it is colonised by the fungus Curvularia protuberata and the fungus is in turn colonised by a particular virus, the grass is able to tolerate soil temperatures of up to 65 °C that would otherwise be lethal. Due to the distinctiveness and isolation of this taxon, it is sometimes considered to be a separate species: Dichanthelium thermale.
