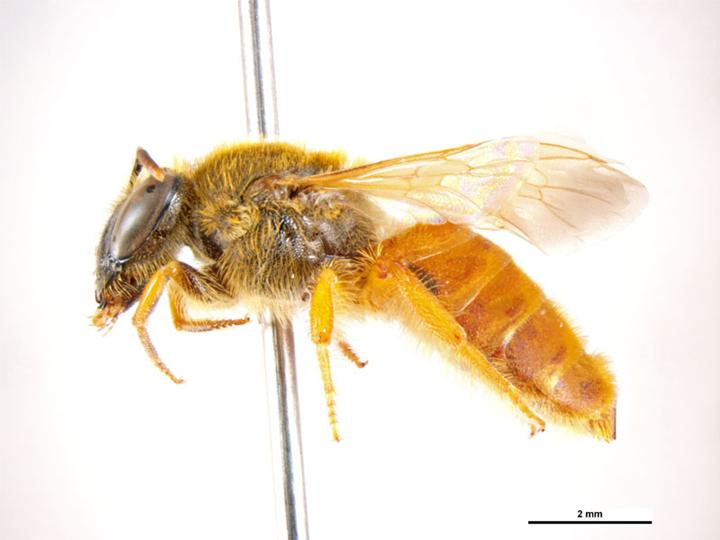
- Female

Scientific classification
- Kingdom: Animalia
- Phylum: Arthropoda
- Clade: Pancrustacea
- Class: Insecta
- Order: Hymenoptera
- Family: Colletidae
- Genus: Dasyhesma
- Species: D. aurea

Binomial name
- Dasyhesma aurea Exley, 2004

= Dasyhesma aurea =

Species of bee

Dasyhesma aurea is a species of bee in the family Colletidae and the subfamily Euryglossinae. It is endemic to Australia. It was described in 2004 by Australian entomologist Elizabeth Exley.

== Etymology ==
The specific epithet aurea is a Latin reference to the characteristic golden setae (body hairs).

== Description ==
Measurements of female specimens are: body length 9.0 mm, wing length 5.5 mm. Males: body length 7.0 mm, wing length 5.0 mm. The head and mesosoma are black; the metasoma is orange-yellow (females) or dark brown (males); the setae are golden.

== Distribution and habitat ==
The species occurs in the Mid West region of Western Australia. The type locality is the East Yuna Nature Reserve, some 34 km west-north-west of Mullewa.

== Behaviour ==
The adults are flying mellivores. Flowering plants visited by the bees include Jacksonia cupulifera, Malleostemon roseus and Baeckea species.

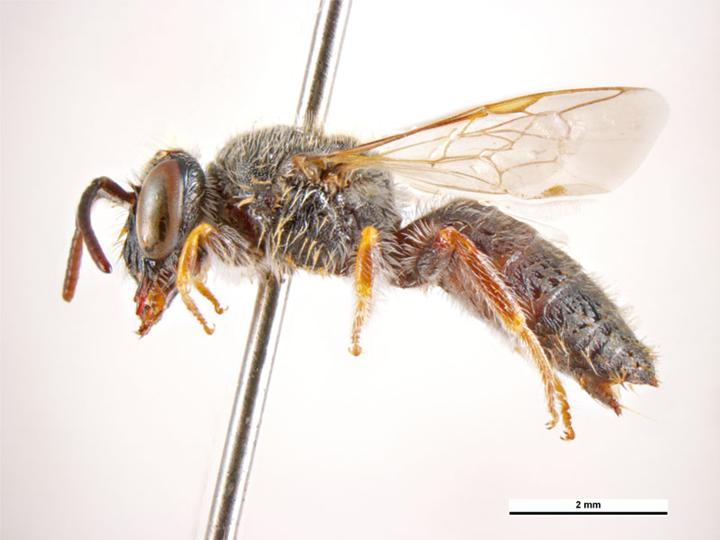
Male
