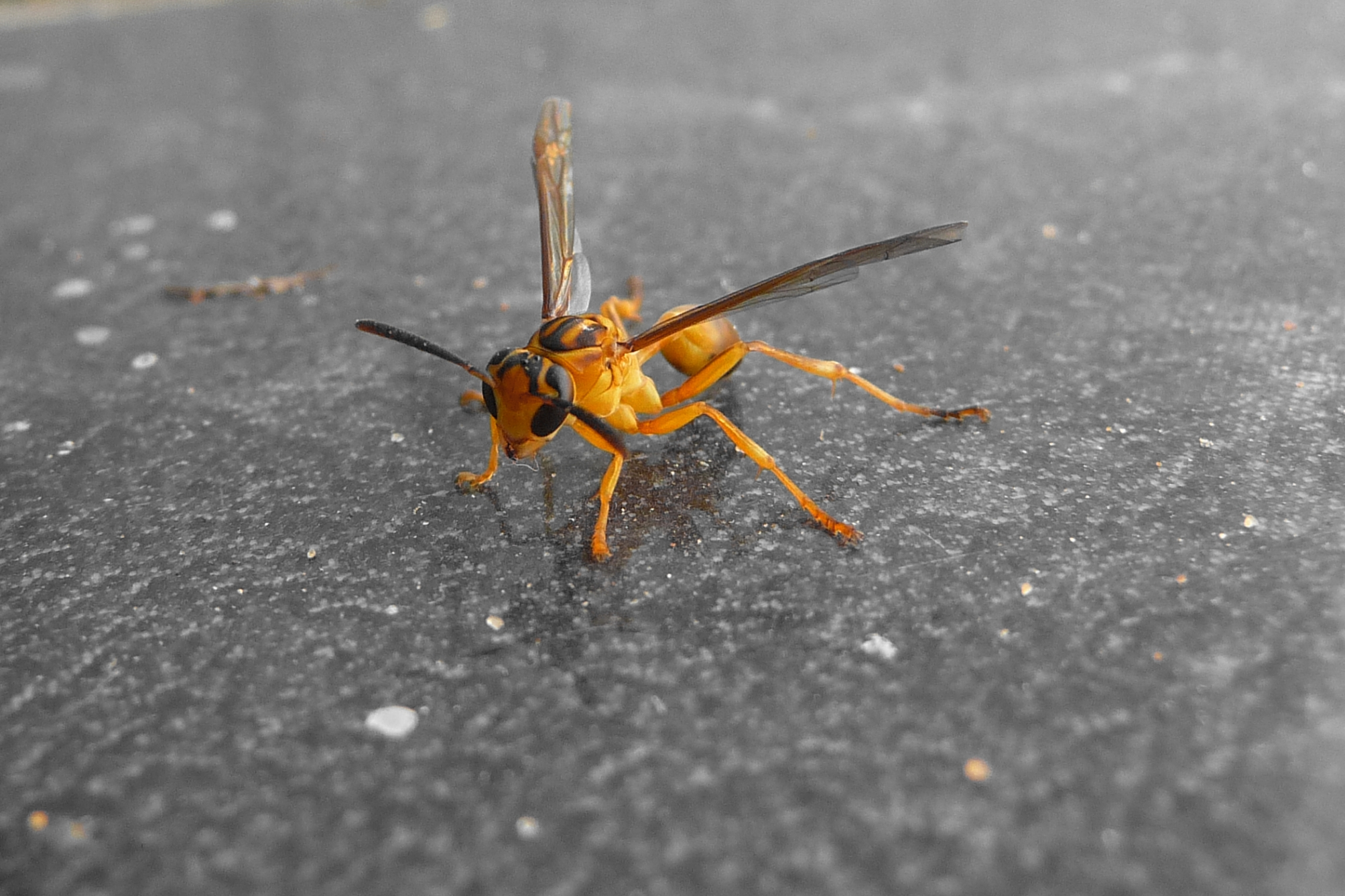
- Adult Agelaia pallipes

Conservation status
- Least Concern (IUCN 3.1)

Scientific classification
- Kingdom: Animalia
- Phylum: Arthropoda
- Class: Insecta
- Order: Hymenoptera
- Family: Vespidae
- Subfamily: Polistinae
- Tribe: Epiponini
- Genus: Agelaia
- Species: A. pallipes

Binomial name
- Agelaia pallipes (Olivier, 1792)

Synonyms=
- Polybia lutea Ducke, 1904; Stelolybia pallidipes (Olivier, 1792); Gymnopolybia pallidipes (Olivier, 1792); Vespa pallipes Olivier, 1792

= Agelaia pallipes =

Species of wasp

Agelaia pallipes is a species of social paper wasp found from Costa Rica to Brazil, Argentina and Paraguay. A. pallipes is ground-nesting and is one of the most aggressive wasps in South America. This species is a predator of other insects, including flies, moths, and ground crickets, as well as baby birds.

== Taxonomy and phylogeny ==
A. pallipes is part of the family Vespidae, subfamily Polistinae, tribe Epiponini, and subsequently the genus Agelaia. Vespidae is characterized by the eusociality of its members. Eusociality refers to the complex organization of animal behavior and is defined by these four attributes: adults live in groups, cooperative care of juveniles, reproductive division of labor where only specific members have the capacity to reproduce, and an overlap of generations. In Polistinae, prey and other food resources are masticated and fed to larvae, who in turn give back a clear but nutritious liquid which the adults then consume. The Epopini is a tribe of Polistinae characterized by being polygynic, with many queens and reproduction in swarms.

Relatives of A. pallipes in the Agelaia genus include: A. vicina, A. flavipennis, A. areata, A. angulicollis, A. cajennensis, A. fulvofasciata, A. myrmecophila, A. yepocapa, and A. panamaensis.

== Description ==
Depending on their location and altitude, A. pallipes can vary from 9.05 to 9.21 mm (0.356 to 0.363 in) in length and are yellow with black maculation. Their head displays a range of colors of black, yellow and brown. Their bodily terga vary from yellow to brown and black. Their legs and wings are also yellow. There is clear dimorphism between queens (egg-layers) and sterile female workers with the former displaying physical superiority and size in 17 of 22 characteristics relating to the head, mesosoma, metasoma and wings. There is also clear dimorphism between ovary development of the two different castes of females. Longer and developed ovaries are seen in queens whereas short, thread-like ovaries are seen in workers. There is a stark absence of no transitional females (workers with developed ovaries) thus showing unambiguous division between castes. Furthermore, what separates workers from queens is the presence of a brown or black stripe on the humeri.

Their nests are composed of vertical combs made of horizontal combs forming a single form row of concentric hemispheres. Found in ground cavities, their nests are found to have a maximum diameter of 50 cm (20 in) with a maximum of 16,500 individuals.

== Distribution and habitat ==
Being a species of tropical distribution, A. pallipes is found in the central and northern regions of South America and is commonly restricted to the high-altitude mountain forests and open fields at over 3,000 m (9,800 ft) in altitude. The wasp favors regions of more temperate climate as their preferred regions showed a range of temperatures from 4 °C-12 °C. A. pallipes builds nests in these forests and open fields; however, it is observed to be a ground nesting species with frequent colony displacement. These wasps will not construct envelopes for their nests and, instead, will prefer to obscure themselves in the cavities of tree trunks. In addition to tree trunks, A. pallipes will construct their nests in armadillo tunnels, hollow logs, and man-made constructions. In temperate climates, A. pallipes is found to be among the most abundant species along with its close relative, A. vicina.

== Colony cycle ==
An important characteristic of A. pallipes is its swarm-founding behavior. In swarm-founding species, a large group of workers and one or more queens initiate a new colony and subsequently display polygynic behavior. In contrast to independent-founding species that engage in continuous construction of nests, swarm-founding A. pallipes will engage in periodic construction where the nest is rapidly built to sustain a specific population size. After which, the nest size stays static until capacity is reached and subsequent expansion is necessary where thousands of cells can be built within days.

The colony cycle is the developmental period between one reproductive episode and the next. For swarm-founding species like A. pallipes, new colony reproduction is not necessarily coupled with queen production. Due to their region of preference, the neotropics, the onset of nest foundation varies over a number of months and even seasons exclusive of only the deepest of winter periods. Therefore, unlike its relatives in temperate regions, nest foundation is not limited to the beginning of the favorable season.

== Behavior ==
As seen in the dimorphism between queens and workers, castes can be determined based on both behavior and morphology. As part of the Epiponini tribe, A. pallipes is characterized by being neotropical, polygynous and in relative abundance. The queens’ primary job is to reproduce whereas the workers are charged with foraging for food, caring for the larvae and defending the nest. As necessary with this type of hierarchy, there must be a mechanism for distinguishing between females’ ability to reproduce in a social setting. This reproductive control or suppression has been recently credited to pre-imaginal caste determination via the mechanism of insemination. The lack of intermediate females (workers with developed ovaries) implies heavy control of reproduction. It is hypothesized that only with the advent of insemination, the female will then be able to develop their ovaries adequately to become a layer. Observation has denoted that interactions among queen A. pallipes are unaggressive therefore implying that workers are most important in queen selection.

As a swarm-founding species, it has been observed that in order to communicate at a macro level, individuals will leave a leave a pheromone trail for other members of the nest to follow. Rubbing their gastral sternites on objects when moving in the swarm leaves this trail.

== Polyethism ==
There is clear polyethism among A. pallipes where the young workers care for the larvae and older workers forage and defend the nest. It is hypothesized that the young workers are delegated to stay in the nest and care for larvae because it is significantly safer within the confines of the nest while the older workers are outside being exposed to predation in order to increase life expectancy of the workers. Other activities performed by the older workers include removing larvae from the nest, rubbing gaster on the nest and destroying cells. Intra-cell activities like checking cells, moving gaster and self-grooming were all-indicative of younger workers. Therefore, there is a clear relation between age and function thus implying that A. pallipes displays temporal polyethism behavior.

== Morphology ==
There is clear dimorphism between queen and worker A. pallipes with the former caste observed to be physically superior in 22 characters. Pre-imaginal determination has been referenced to be the reason for differentiation between them. A stark difference between the two castes of females can be seen through examining their ovaries – type A ovaries display filament-appearance with no developed oocytes whereas type B ovaries were longer and well developed and coupled with several mature oocytes. Type B ovaries also contained sperm and could very clearly be categorized as those of queens where as type A ovaries were observed as uninseminated thus identifying as those of workers. This dimorphism displays strong control of sexual organs upon pre-imaginal determination.

A. pallipes morphology is also affected by the altitude with an inverse relationship between higher altitude and reduction in body size, especially hind femur length and head width. The cloud forest environment, where some of these A. pallipes are found, contribute negatively to foraging activity and force individuals to complete life cycles with a smaller body size. This study along the altitudinal gradient provides insight on A. pallipes capacity to adapt morphologically to more severe conditions.

== Kin and mate selection ==
Pre-imaginal determination is the predominant theory as to why certain females become reproductively capable over others. There is a lack of queen-queen aggression that suggests that only workers are involved in the queen selection process. The mechanism for workers choosing their queens is still unclear – however, the pervading theory is related to body size and that the largest females are chosen due to higher survivability. Research has also suggested that the workers have a mechanism for identifying those females who are more fecund and allowing them to identify, and discard, those with less favorable ovaries. Naturally, in a polygynic society of swarm-founding individuals with so many queens, kin selection becomes a challenge. With so many queens, it is expected to have a lower relatedness between workers and the larvae for which they care. Though it is expected that workers will strive to reproduce those who are most like themselves in order to pass on their genes, eusociality still persists.

== Feeding and foraging ==
Agelaia pallipes will normally feed on other insects (flies, moths, butterflies), however, it has been recently discovered that A. pallipes will also feed on carrion. Though the collection of bodily fluids is preferred, the wasp will also settle to take carrion morsels to their larvae; furthermore, it has been documented in recent studies that they will chew tissues of cavities in order to find liquids. A. pallipes was observed to feed on carrion primarily during the fresh stage (98% of occurrences) which can lead to significant forensic importance when determining the post-mortem interval.

A. pallipes has been observed to display social facilitation for recruitment to food resources. This type of behavior is seen in other carrion eaters like crows and ravens where the pooling of independent search efforts is the most efficient way to locate food sources and subsequently defend them from other organisms. This behavior can very quickly develop into an Evolutionary Stable Strategy for the species.

== Competition ==
A. pallipes have been observed to directly compete with several species of ants when contending for food resources. The A. pallipes workers, when approaching an occupied food source, will fly low and flap their wings in order to free areas. The workers will recruit other members of their species from the nest as a form of social facilitation and thus display increased dominance at resources by displaying their competitive behavior. Therefore, like social facilitation for feeding and foraging, the A. pallipes will attempt to recruit its nest mates in order to gain advantages over competitors.

A. pallipes will compete with other species of wasp and will, due to its aggressiveness, generally be successful as seen in their superior abundance on carcasses in the primary stages of decay. However, even though A. pallipes is usually victorious in its interactions, it has been observed that A. pallipes will often be out-competed by certain species of stingless bees.

== Communication ==
By virtue of such large numbers, swarm-founding members must necessarily have a method of communication that will allow the entire nest to coordinate movements efficiently. In a swarm-founding species like A. pallipes, the main conduit of communication is through the use of pheromones. Most individuals of the tribe Epiponini have a Richard's gland to release the pheromones, which is an exocrine gland located on the underside the abdomen. However, it is absent in Agelaia and instead, it is hypothesized that the van der Vecht's gland is the alternative source for the communicative pheromone. By rubbing their gastral on objects, they leave a pheromone trail for their worker counterparts to follow suit. As noticed in A. pallipes foraging habits, the eusocial wasps also receive visual stimulus that communicates to the individual to join the larger group. It was observed through bait stations that those stations with wasp models were better dominated by wasps when ant competition was also present. Furthermore, scientists have proved that even without their olfactory senses, the mere presence of wasp models was enough for recruitment. Thus it is clear that though A. pallipes communicate through the release of trail pheromones, they can also be recruited through simple visual stimuli.

== Human importance and current research ==
Social wasps use venom to defend the nest from intruders and predators and have, in many instances, caused severe deleterious effects in major organs in the human body and other organisms. Due to the aggressiveness of A. pallipes and the number of instances between humans and wasps, the characterization of its venom has become an important issue for scientists.

Recent studies have characterized two novel peptides in the venom of the social wasp: Protonectin and Agelaia-MP. The first venom, Protonectin, is found to be the same venom from relative neotropical social wasp, Protonectarina sylveirae. In cohesion, the two peptide toxins were tested for and displayed potent ability to negatively effect hemolytic activity, mass cell granulation, and chemotaxis in large vertebrates. The inhibition of these activities can result in anaphylactic shock, renal failure and myonecrosis in humans. Certainly, the characterization and identification of these novel A. pallipes toxins will allow scientists to elucidate the mechanism of envenoming which will lead to future pharmacological breakthroughs.
