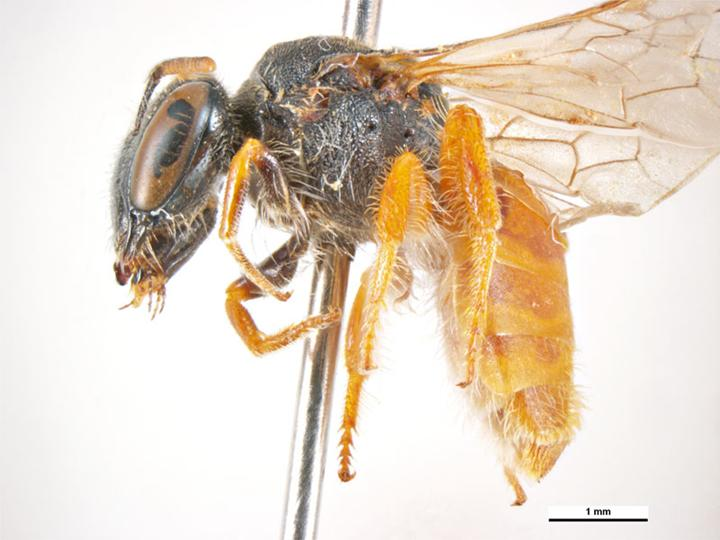
- Female

Scientific classification
- Kingdom: Animalia
- Phylum: Arthropoda
- Clade: Pancrustacea
- Class: Insecta
- Order: Hymenoptera
- Family: Colletidae
- Genus: Dasyhesma
- Species: D. baeckea

Binomial name
- Dasyhesma baeckea Exley, 2004

= Dasyhesma baeckea =

Species of bee

Dasyhesma baeckea is a species of bee in the family Colletidae and the subfamily Euryglossinae. It is endemic to Australia. It was described in 2004 by Australian entomologist Elizabeth Exley.

== Etymology ==
The specific epithet baeckea is a reference to a favoured food plant.

== Description ==
Measurements of female specimens are: body length 7.0 mm, wing length 5.0 mm. The head and mesosoma are black, the metasoma orange.

== Distribution and habitat ==
The species occurs in the Mid West region of Western Australia. The type locality is 10 km west-north-west of Eurardy Reserve. It has also been recorded near Kalbarri.

== Behaviour ==
The adults are flying mellivores. Flowering plants visited by the bees include Baeckea species.
