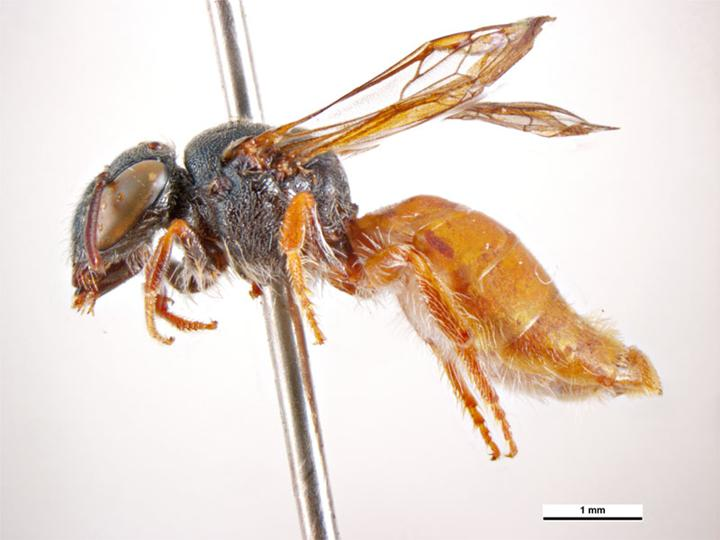
- Female

Scientific classification
- Kingdom: Animalia
- Phylum: Arthropoda
- Clade: Pancrustacea
- Class: Insecta
- Order: Hymenoptera
- Family: Colletidae
- Genus: Dasyhesma
- Species: D. brevipalpa

Binomial name
- Dasyhesma brevipalpa Exley, 2004

= Dasyhesma brevipalpa =

Species of bee

Dasyhesma brevipalpa is a species of bee in the family Colletidae and the subfamily Euryglossinae. It is endemic to Australia. It was described in 2004 by Australian entomologist Elizabeth Exley.

== Etymology ==
The specific epithet brevipalpa (Latin: "short palps") is an anatomical reference to the distinctively short labial palps.

== Description ==
Measurements of female specimens are: body length 6.5 mm, wing length 4.0 mm; males: body length is 5.0 mm, wing length is 3.0 mm. The head and mesosoma are black, and the metasoma orange (females) or dark brown (males).

== Distribution and habitat ==
The species occurs in the Mid West region of Western Australia. The type locality is 13 km north of Eurardy Reserve.

== Behaviour ==
The adults are flying mellivores. Flowering plants visited by the bees include Chamelaucium oenanthum, as well as Baeckea, Verticordia and Pileanthus species.

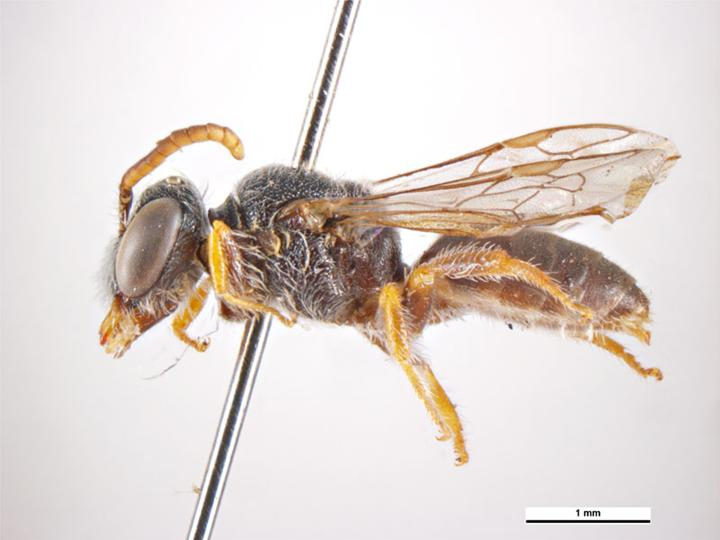
Male
