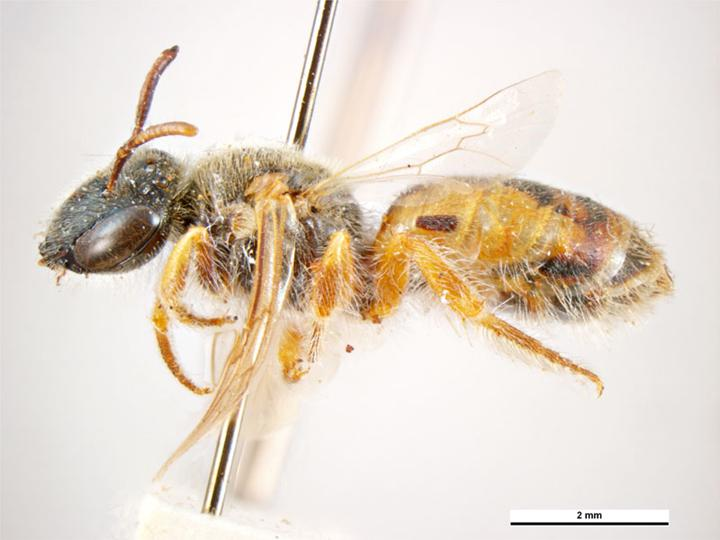
- Female

Scientific classification
- Kingdom: Animalia
- Phylum: Arthropoda
- Clade: Pancrustacea
- Class: Insecta
- Order: Hymenoptera
- Family: Colletidae
- Genus: Dasyhesma
- Species: D. coolgardensis

Binomial name
- Dasyhesma coolgardensis Exley, 2004

= Dasyhesma coolgardensis =

Species of bee

Dasyhesma coolgardensis is a species of bee in the family Colletidae and the subfamily Euryglossinae. It is endemic to Australia. It was described in 2004 by Australian entomologist Elizabeth Exley.

== Etymology ==
The specific epithet coolgardensis refers to the type locality.

== Description ==
Measurements of female specimens are: body length 6.5 mm, wing length 4.0 mm. The head and mesosoma are black, the metasoma orange.

== Distribution and habitat ==
The species occurs in southern inland Western Australia. The type locality is 40 km south of Coolgardie.

== Behaviour ==
The adults are flying mellivores.
