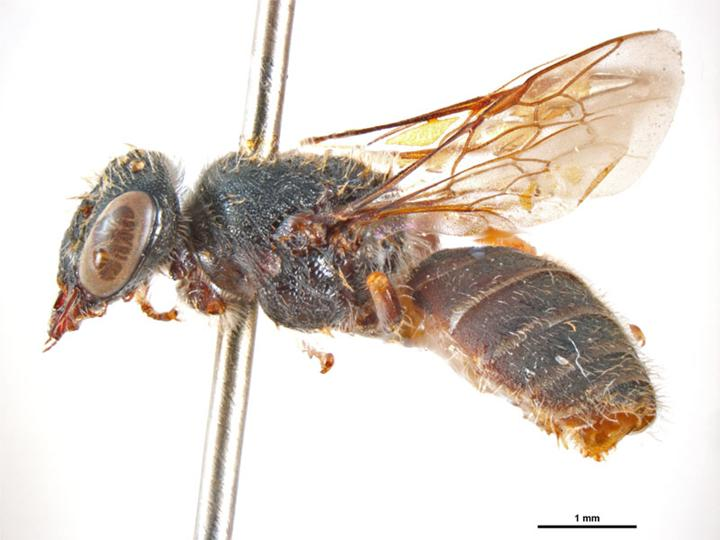
- Female

Scientific classification
- Kingdom: Animalia
- Phylum: Arthropoda
- Clade: Pancrustacea
- Class: Insecta
- Order: Hymenoptera
- Family: Colletidae
- Genus: Dasyhesma
- Species: D. dilata

Binomial name
- Dasyhesma dilata Exley, 2004

= Dasyhesma dilata =

Species of bee

Dasyhesma dilata is a species of bee in the family Colletidae and the subfamily Euryglossinae. It is endemic to Australia. It was described in 2004 by Australian entomologist Elizabeth Exley.

== Etymology ==
The specific epithet dilata (Latin: "spread out") is an anatomical reference to the placement of punctures on the mesosoma.

== Description ==
Measurements of female specimens are: body length 8.0 mm, wing length 5.0 mm. Males: body length 6.5 mm, wing length 4.5 mm. The head and mesosoma are dark red to black, the metasoma dark brown to black.

== Distribution and habitat ==
The species occurs in the Wheatbelt of Western Australia. The type locality is Yellowdine.

== Behaviour ==
The adults are flying mellivores. Flowering plants visited by the bees include Baeckea species.
