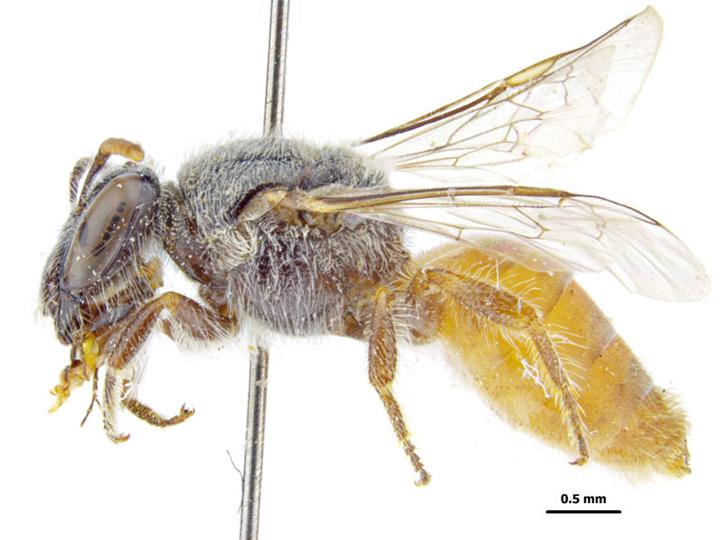
- Female

Scientific classification
- Kingdom: Animalia
- Phylum: Arthropoda
- Clade: Pancrustacea
- Class: Insecta
- Order: Hymenoptera
- Family: Colletidae
- Genus: Dasyhesma
- Species: D. argentea

Binomial name
- Dasyhesma argentea Exley, 2004

= Dasyhesma argentea =

Species of bee

Dasyhesma argentea is a species of bee in the family Colletidae and the subfamily Euryglossinae. It is endemic to Australia. It was described in 2004 by Australian entomologist Elizabeth Exley.

== Etymology ==
The specific epithet argentea refers to a favoured food plant.

== Description ==
Measurements of female specimens are: body length 6.5 mm, wing length 4.0 mm. Males: body length 4.0 mm, wing length 3.5 mm. Head and mesosoma are black; metasoma is orange and brown (females) or black (males).

== Distribution and habitat ==
The species occurs in the Mid West region of Western Australia. The type locality is 10.5 km south of Eneabba.

== Behaviour ==
The adults are flying mellivores. Flowering plants visited by the bees include Verticordia argentea.

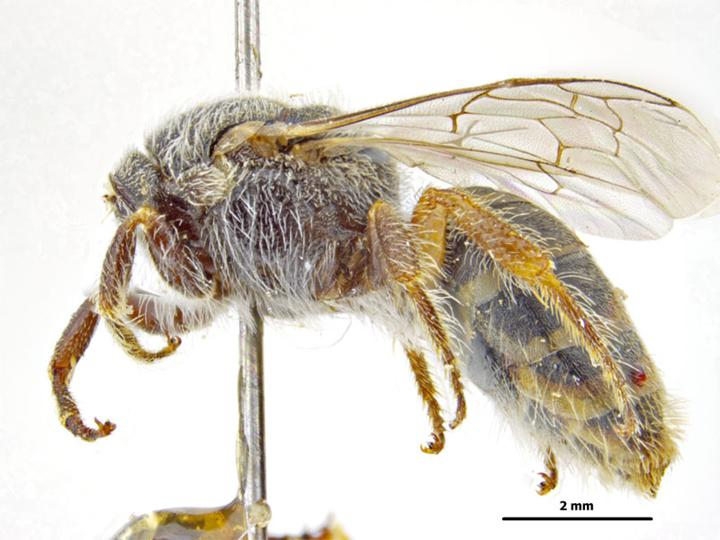
Male
