= Dasyhesma boharti =

Scientific classification
- Kingdom: Animalia
- Phylum: Arthropoda
- Clade: Pancrustacea
- Class: Insecta
- Order: Hymenoptera
- Family: Colletidae
- Genus: Dasyhesma
- Species: D. boharti

Binomial name
- Dasyhesma boharti Exley, 2004

Species of bee

Dasyhesma boharti is a species of bee in the family Colletidae and the subfamily Euryglossinae. It is endemic to Australia. It was described in 2004 by Australian entomologist Elizabeth Exley.

== Etymology ==
The specific epithet boharti honours American entomologist Richard Bohart.

== Description ==
Measurements of female specimens are: body length 8.0 mm, wing length 5.0 mm. The head and mesosoma are black, the metasoma yellow-brown with black markings.

== Distribution and habitat ==
The species occurs in the Wheatbelt of Western Australia. The type locality is Carrabin.

== Behaviour ==
The adults are flying mellivores.
