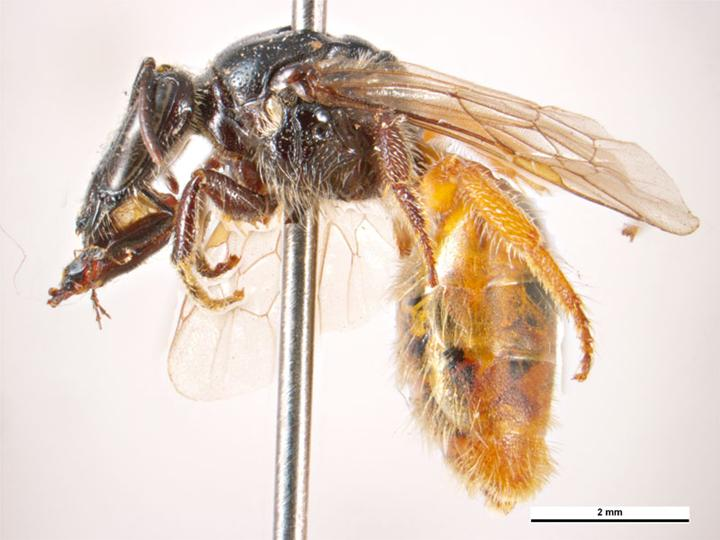
- Female

Scientific classification
- Kingdom: Animalia
- Phylum: Arthropoda
- Clade: Pancrustacea
- Class: Insecta
- Order: Hymenoptera
- Family: Colletidae
- Genus: Dasyhesma
- Species: D. depressa

Binomial name
- Dasyhesma depressa Exley, 2004

= Dasyhesma depressa =

Species of bee

Dasyhesma depressa is a species of bee in the family Colletidae and the subfamily Euryglossinae. It is endemic to Australia. It was described in 2004 by Australian entomologist Elizabeth Exley.

== Etymology ==
The specific epithet depressa refers to the 'pressed down' appearance of the middle of the face.

== Description ==
Measurements of female specimens are: body length 8.0 mm, wing length 5.0 mm. Head and mesosoma are black and shiny; the metasoma is yellow-orange with black markings.

== Distribution and habitat ==
The species occurs in the Mid West region of Western Australia. The type locality is Red Bluff in Kalbarri National Park.

== Behaviour ==
The adults are flying mellivores.
