= Dasyhesma spicata =

Scientific classification
- Kingdom: Animalia
- Phylum: Arthropoda
- Clade: Pancrustacea
- Class: Insecta
- Order: Hymenoptera
- Family: Colletidae
- Genus: Dasyhesma
- Species: D. spicata

Binomial name
- Dasyhesma spicata Exley, 2004

Species of bee

Dasyhesma spicata is a species of bee in the family Colletidae and the subfamily Euryglossinae. It is endemic to Australia. It was described in 2004 by Australian entomologist Elizabeth Exley.

== Etymology ==
The specific epithet spicata refers to a favoured food plant.

== Description ==
Measurements of female specimens are: body length 7.0 mm, wing length 4.5 mm. The head and mesosoma are black, the metasoma orange-brown.

== Distribution and habitat ==
The species occurs in the Mid West region of Western Australia. The type locality is 54 km north-north-east of Kalbarri.

== Behaviour ==
The adults are flying mellivores. Flowering plants visited by the bees include Verticordia spicata.
