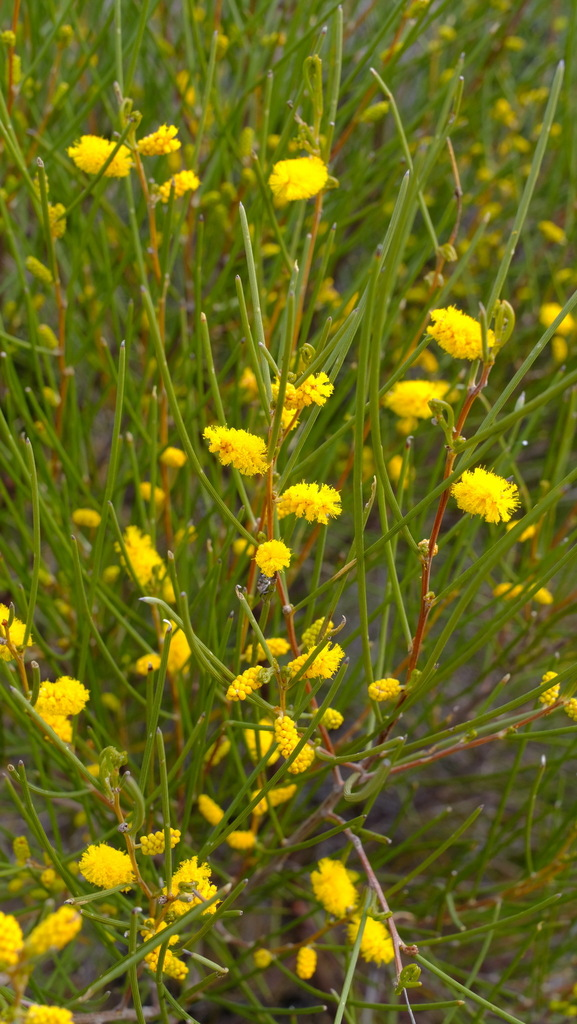

Scientific classification
- Kingdom: Plantae
- Clade: Embryophytes
- Clade: Tracheophytes
- Clade: Spermatophytes
- Clade: Angiosperms
- Clade: Eudicots
- Clade: Rosids
- Order: Fabales
- Family: Fabaceae
- Subfamily: Caesalpinioideae
- Clade: Mimosoid clade
- Genus: Acacia
- Subgenus: Acacia subg. Juliflorae
- Species: A. sibina

Binomial name
- Acacia sibina Maslin
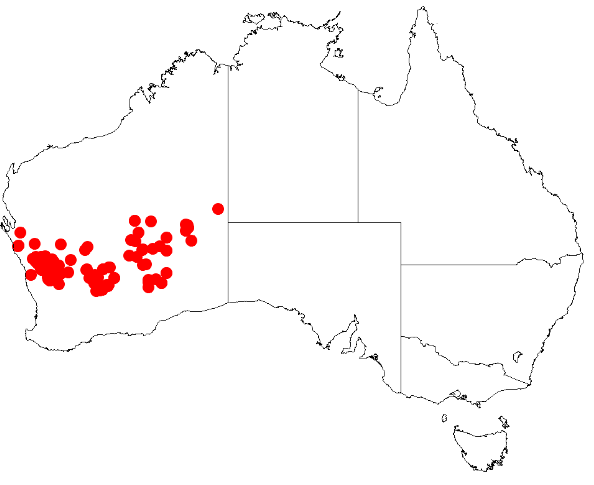
- Occurrence data from AVH

= Acacia sibina =

Species of legume

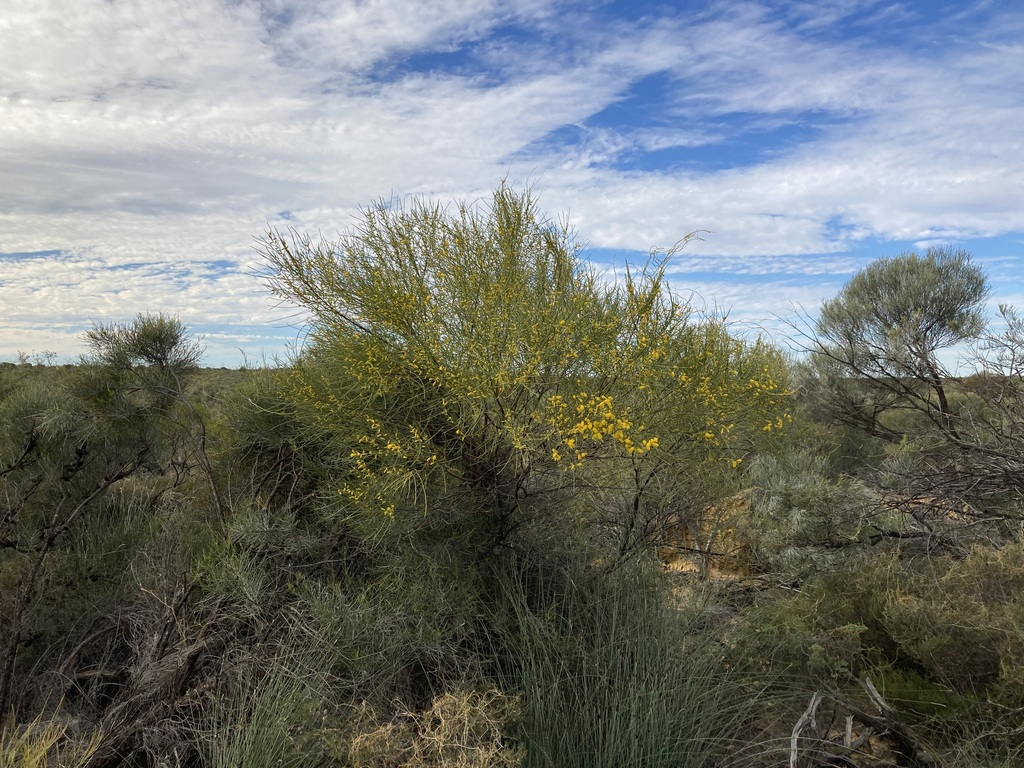
Habit near Eurardy

Acacia sibina is a species of tree or shrub belonging to the genus Acacia and the subgenus Juliflorae the is endemic to parts of western Australia.

== Description ==
The erect tree or shrub typically grows to a height of 1 to 4 metres (3 to 13 ft). It has glabrous branchlets that are tomentulose in axils where the phyllodes are found. The erect, terete and evergreen phyllodes are straight to slightly curved. The rigid an glaucous phyllodes have a length of 6 to 22 cm (2.4 to 8.7 in) and a diameter of 1 to 2 m (3 ft 3 in to 6 ft 7 in). They have a pungent odour and are indistinctly striate. It blooms from August to October producing yellow flowers. The simple inflorescences are found in pairs in the axils. Each flower-spike has a cylindrical shape with a length of 7 to 22 mm (0.28 to 0.87 in) and a diameter of 7 mm (0.28 in) and are quite densely flowered packed with golden coloured flowers. After flowering firmly chartaceous linear shaped seed pods form that are raised over and constricted between each of the seeds. The glabrous pods can have a length of up to 12 cm (4.7 in) and a width of 4 to 6 mm (0.16 to 0.24 in). The glossy dark brown seeds are arranged longitudinally within the pods. The seeds have an elliptic shape with a length of 3.5 to 4 mm (0.14 to 0.16 in) and have a yellow aril.

== Taxonomy ==
It was first described in 1977 by Bruce Maslin.

== Distribution ==
A. sibina is native to a large area in the Mid West, Goldfields and Wheatbelt region of Western Australia where it is often situated on flats, sand plains and rocky hills growing in gravelly, yellow or red sandy soils or loamy soils over laterite.

== See also ==
- List of Acacia species
