= Calytrix ecalycata =

Scientific classification
- Kingdom: Plantae
- Clade: Tracheophytes
- Clade: Angiosperms
- Clade: Eudicots
- Clade: Rosids
- Order: Myrtales
- Family: Myrtaceae
- Genus: Calytrix
- Species: C. ecalycata

Binomial name
- Calytrix ecalycata Craven

Synonyms
- Calythropsis aurea C.A.Gardner

Species of flowering plant

Calytrix ecalycata is a species of flowering plant in the myrtle family Myrtaceae and is endemic to the south-west of Western Australia. It is a slender, erect shrub with linear to narrowly elliptic leaves, and yellow flowers with 35 to 50 stamens in several rows.

== Description ==
Calytrix ecalycata is a slender, erect shrub that typically grows to a height of up to 1.6 m (5 ft 3 in). Its leaves are arranged alternately, elliptic, linear to narrowly elliptic, 3–9 mm (0.12–0.35 in) long and 0.50–0.75 mm (0.020–0.030 in) wide on a petiole 0.5 mm (0.020 in) long. The flowers are borne in clusters 10–20 mm (0.39–0.79 in) wide on a peduncle about 0.5 mm (0.020 in) long. The floral leaves are shorter and broader than the stem leaves, linear or elliptic, 3–6 mm (0.12–0.24 in) long and 1–2 mm (0.039–0.079 in) wide. The floral tube is glabrous 4–6 mm (0.16–0.24 in) long, has 4 ribs. There are no sepals and the petals are yellow, narrowly elliptic to oblong, 5–7 mm (0.20–0.28 in) long and about 2 mm (0.079 in) wide. There are 35 to 50 yellow stamens 4–8 mm (0.16–0.31 in) long in several rows. Flowering time varies with subspecies.

== Taxonomy ==
This species was first formally described in 1943 by Charles Gardner who gave it the name Calythropsis aurea in the Journal of the Royal Society of Western Australia from specimens collected near the Arrowsmith River by William Blackall. In 1990, Lyndley Craven found the genus Calythropsis to be congeneric with Calytrix in Australian Systematic Botany, and gave it the new name Calytrix ecalycata. The specific epithet (ecalycata) means 'having no calyx'. In 2004, Greg Keighery described 3 subspecies of Calytrix ecalycata in the journal Nuytsia and the names are accepted by the Australian Plant Census:

- Calytrix ecalycata subsp. brevis Keighery is a shrub 1.0 m (3 ft 3 in) tall and wide with linear to narrowly elliptic leaves 3–5 mm (0.12–0.20 in) long, floral leaves 3–4 mm (0.12–0.16 in) and 0.5 mm (0.020 in) wide, petals 5–6 mm (0.20–0.24 in) wide, and flowers from August to October.
- Calytrix ecalycata Craven subsp. ecalycata is a shrub 1.6 m (5 ft 3 in) tall and wide with elliptic to egg-shaped leaves 7–9 mm (0.28–0.35 in) long, floral leaves 4–6 mm (0.16–0.24 in) and 2 mm (0.079 in) wide, petals 6–7 mm (0.24–0.28 in) wide, and flowers in August and September.
- Calytrix ecalycata subsp. pubescens Keighery is a shrub 0.6 m (2 ft 0 in) tall and wide with linear leaves 4–6 mm (0.16–0.24 in) long, floral leaves 4–6 mm (0.16–0.24 in) and 1 mm (0.039 in) wide, petals 5–6 mm (0.20–0.24 in) wide, and flowers in September.

== Distribution and habitat ==
This species of Calytrix grows on sandplains, flats, ridges, hills and roadsides between Port Gregory and Regans Ford in the Avon Wheatbelt, Geraldton Sandplains, Swan Coastal Plain bioregions of south-western Western Australia. The 3 subspecies occur in the same area, subspecies brevis on sandplains and low rises in mallee shrubland and mixed shrubland from Coorow to near Moora and south to Regans Ford, subsp. ecalycata in winter-wet wandoo woodland, Melaleuca uncinata shrubland, mixed low heath and Eucalyptus eudesmioides mallee. Subspecies pubescens is only known from the type location south-west of Moora, where it grows in wandoo woodland.

== Conservation status ==
The species Calytrix ecalycata is listed as "not threatened" but subspecies brevis and ecalycata are classed as "Priority Three by the Government of Western Australia Department of Biodiversity, Conservation and Attractions meaning that they are poorly known and known from only a few locations but are not under imminent threat, and subspecies pubescens as "Priority One" by the Government of Western Australia Department of Biodiversity, Conservation and Attractions, meaning that it is known from only one or a few locations that are potentially at risk.
