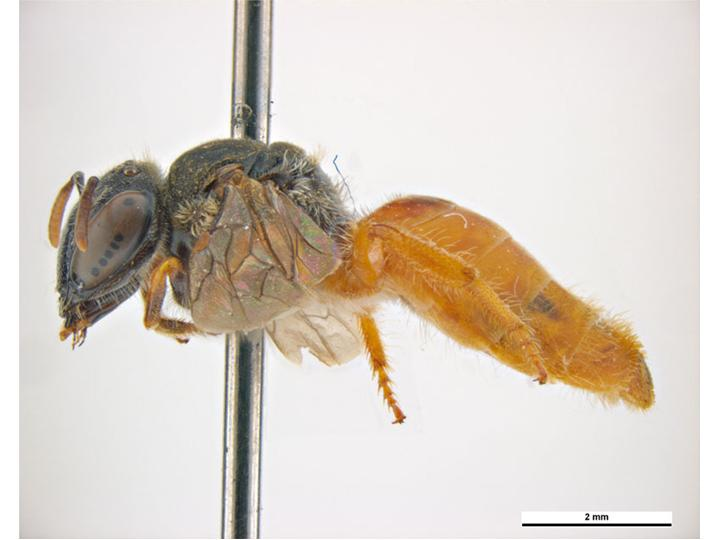
- Female

Scientific classification
- Kingdom: Animalia
- Phylum: Arthropoda
- Clade: Pancrustacea
- Class: Insecta
- Order: Hymenoptera
- Family: Colletidae
- Genus: Dasyhesma
- Species: D. albula

Binomial name
- Dasyhesma albula Exley, 2004

= Dasyhesma albula =

Species of bee

Dasyhesma albula is a species of bee in the family Colletidae and the subfamily Euryglossinae. It is endemic to Australia. It was described in 2004 by Australian entomologist Elizabeth Exley.

== Etymology ==
The specific epithet albula is a Latin reference to the characteristic white setae (body hairs).

== Description ==
Measurements of female specimens are: body length 9.0 mm, wing length 5.0 mm. The metasoma is orange; the setae are white.

== Distribution and habitat ==
The species occurs in the Mid West region of Western Australia. The type locality is 54 km north-north-east of Kalbarri.

== Behaviour ==
The adults are flying mellivores. Flowering plants visited by the bees include Baeckea blackallii and Thryptomene strongylophylla.
