= Leioproctus diloris =

Scientific classification
- Kingdom: Animalia
- Phylum: Arthropoda
- Clade: Pancrustacea
- Class: Insecta
- Order: Hymenoptera
- Family: Colletidae
- Genus: Leioproctus
- Species: L. diloris

Binomial name
- Leioproctus diloris Batley, 2025

Species of bee

Leioproctus diloris, or Leioproctus (Euryglossidia) diloris, is a species of bee in the family Colletidae and subfamily Colletinae. It is endemic to Australia. It was described by entomologist Michael Batley in 2025.

== Etymology ==
The specific epithet diloris (Latin: "two-striped") is an anatomical reference to banding on the male metasoma.

== Description ==
The male body length is about 6.7 mm, female body length 7.5 mm. Integumental colouration is mainly black with the metasoma dull orange and brown. The hair is white and brown.

== Distribution and habitat ==
The species occurs in the south of Western Australia. The type locality is 60 km north of Esperance.

== Behaviour ==
The adults are flying mellivores. Flowering plants visited by the bees include Daviesia species.
