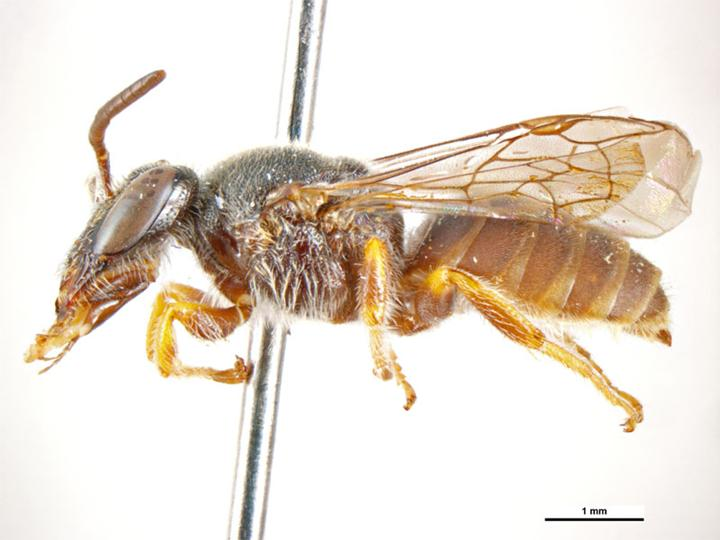
- Female

Scientific classification
- Kingdom: Animalia
- Phylum: Arthropoda
- Clade: Pancrustacea
- Class: Insecta
- Order: Hymenoptera
- Family: Colletidae
- Genus: Dasyhesma
- Species: D. galbina

Binomial name
- Dasyhesma galbina Exley, 2004

= Dasyhesma galbina =

Species of bee

Dasyhesma galbina is a species of bee in the family Colletidae and the subfamily Euryglossinae. It is endemic to Australia. It was described in 2004 by Australian entomologist Elizabeth Exley.

== Etymology ==
The specific epithet galbina (Latin: "yellowish") refers to colouration.

== Description ==
Measurements of female specimens are: body length 8.0 mm, wing length 5.0 mm. Males: body length 6.0 mm, wing length 4.0 mm. The head and mesosoma are black; the metasoma is yellow to orange (females) or dark brown (males).

== Distribution and habitat ==
The species occurs in the Gascoyne region of Western Australia. The type locality is 13 km south of Wannoo.

== Behaviour ==
The adults are flying mellivores. Flowering plants visited by the bees include Verticordia dichroma.
