= Leioproctus eugeniarum =

Scientific classification
- Kingdom: Animalia
- Phylum: Arthropoda
- Clade: Pancrustacea
- Class: Insecta
- Order: Hymenoptera
- Family: Colletidae
- Genus: Leioproctus
- Species: L. eugeniarum

Binomial name
- Leioproctus eugeniarum (Cockerell, 1912)

Synonyms
- Paracolletes eugeniarum Cockerell, 1912

Species of bee

Leioproctus eugeniarum, or Leioproctus (Goniocolletes) eugeniarum, is a species of bee in the family Colletidae and subfamily Colletinae. It is endemic to Australia. It was described by British-American entomologist Theodore Dru Alison Cockerell in 1912.

== Description ==
Female body length is about 11 mm. Colouration is mainly glossy black, with indistinct metasomal bands.

== Distribution and habitat ==
The species occurs in Queensland. The type locality is Mackay.

== Behaviour ==
The adults are flying mellivores. Flowering plants visited by the bees include Eugenia species.
