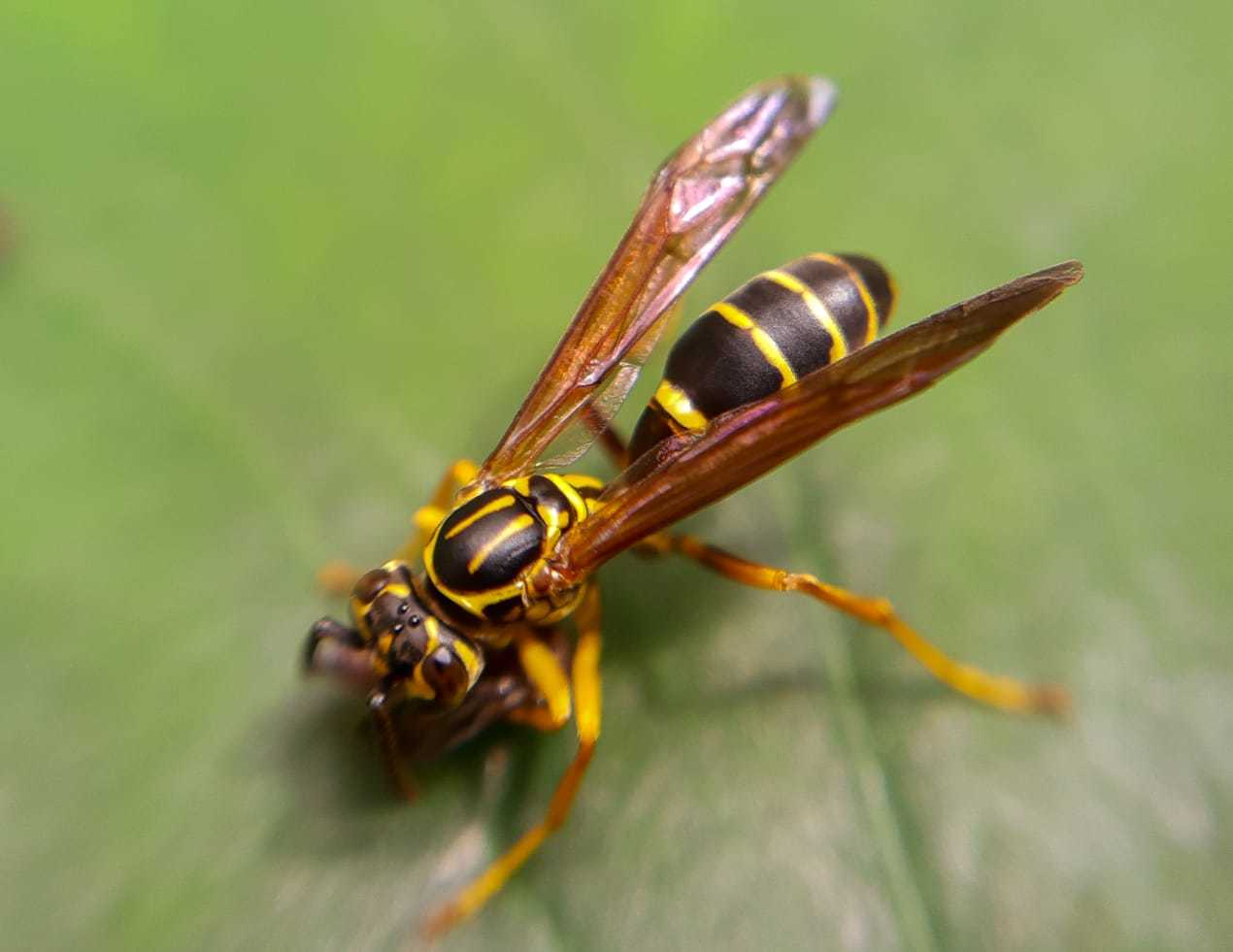

Scientific classification
- Kingdom: Animalia
- Phylum: Arthropoda
- Class: Insecta
- Order: Hymenoptera
- Family: Vespidae
- Subfamily: Polistinae
- Tribe: Epiponini
- Genus: Agelaia
- Species: A. multipicta

Binomial name
- Agelaia multipicta (Haliday, 1836)

Synonyms
- Polistes multipictus Haliday, 1836; Polybia multipicta (Haliday, 1836); Polybia meridionalis R. von Ihering, 1904; Stelopolybia meridionalis Ducke, 1910; Gymnopolybia meridionalis Ducke, 1918; Stelopolybia multipicta (Haliday, 1836)

= Agelaia multipicta =

Species of wasp

Agelaia multipicta is a swarm-founding, highly eusocial wasp that lives in Mexico, Argentina, Trinidad and southern Brazil. It nests in natural cavities such as hollow trees and aggressively defends the nest from ants, who are brood predators. The workers and queens are morphologically distinguished by ovarian development as well as external features such as a larger petiole and gaster in the queen. Like other carrion-eating (necrophagous) wasp species, A. multipicta plays a scavenging role in the ecosystem. Agelaia multipicta was described by the Irish entomologist Alexander Henry Haliday in 1836.

== Description ==
James Carpenter's taxonomic key describes characteristic features of this species such as that the "hind-wing with jugal lobe normal, not reduced," and that the head has an occipital carina present. Additionally, in A. multipicta Carpenter notes the "pronotum without sinuous carina" and the "body without pale maculations, cuticle partly to entirely bluish metallic or yellowish with some bluish highlights; head in lateral view with tempera as wide or wider than eye at ocular sinus"

The queen and worker castes differ significantly in appearance and ovarian development, reflecting their distinct biological functions. The non-reproductive workers have reduced ovaries and brown coloration of the middle tibia and face between the antennal insertions. Queens have a larger and hairier petiole and gaster and yellow mid tibia and face.

== Distribution ==
A. multipicta is found in Mexico, Argentina, Trinidad and Southern Brazil. Usually, their nests are observed in forest and rural habitats. This may be related to the tendency of A. multipicta to use natural cavities as nest building sites which may be less prevalent in urban areas.

A. multipicta is the most abundant wasp species in Matão, in the state of São Paulo, Brazil, a well-preserved area which has little variety of wasp species. The area is surrounded by citrus crops. In a study regarding forest fragmentation there were no strong tendency in A. multipicta habitation regarding habitat type, this is probably due to their generalist nature.

== Nest structure ==
Like other wasps in the Epiponini tribe, A. multipicta builds an exposed, single-comb nest, attached with a broad pedicel to its substrate. A. multipicta's nests are exposed in a sense that they are not surrounded by an envelope. However, the nest usually occurs in spaces that are naturally enclosed, such as hollow trees and cavities in the ground. These natural structures may be filling the protective role usually fulfilled by an envelope. The combs can be irregular, not always parallel, and the cells in some findings are 3.0 mm wide and 9.0 mm deep. The variety of nest architecture and location observed in A. multipicta is thought to reflect their adaptability to the variations in cavity-like spaces present in the natural environment.

== Behavior ==
=== Defense ===
Behavior of A. multipicta seems to be physically as opposed to chemically influenced. Individuals of A. multipicta display aggression towards some, but not all conspecifics encountered on a food source, possibly indicating the ability to recognize nestmates. This species uses aggressive behaviors to combat ants attempting to prey on their brood. Swarm founding wasps, including A. multipicta, evolved a different defense strategy against ants from species with independent founders, which use chemical repellents. Swarm founders rely on the vigilance of workers on the surface of the nest to prevent ants from reaching the brood. Workers immediately remove ants from the nest by directing blasts through wing buzzing. If this fails to knock the ant off, the worker then throws the ant from the nest with their mandibles. A. multipicta retains a 6th sternal gland, which secretes ant repellent chemical in independent founding species. It is unknown whether the chemical function of the gland is retained in A. multipicta. In addition, there has been no observed use of chemical or any other form of communication between wasps of this species while foraging on carrion.

=== Carrion feeding ===
Foragers from different colonies have been observed at the same feeding site, suggesting that colony foraging territories overlap. Scramble competition seems to be the main foraging strategy used by this species. A. multipicta is a major egg predator of the harvestman Acutisoma proximum, despite the maternal guarding attempts by this species. These wasps feed on vertebrate carrion itself as well as the larval flies growing on it. This makes A. multipicta both a predator and a necrophage, but the wasps favor fresh carcasses with more meat as opposed to more decomposed carcasses with more flies, suggesting that predation may not be their primary mode of obtaining food resources.

It is thought that Polistinae wasps are unable to recruit nest mates to carrion and that there is no communication about food resources in the nest. This idea was supported in an experiment in Brazil where foragers were marked upon arriving at an experimental carrion site. The number of incoming individuals were counted respective to time. There was no notable increase of new wasps going to carrion over time. This included instances of individual wasps returning to the carrion multiple times. This suggests that there is not a lack of opportunity to communicate to nest-mates, but perhaps a lack of ability.

There are several possible explanations for why recruitment to food sources may not occur in this species, but none have been experimentally verified. One possibility is that carrion is relatively rare as a food source for A. multipicta and it was not advantageous enough to drive the development of food sharing communication. A second possibility is that colonies may be unable to effectively compete against with other colony groups for carrion resources, so increasing recruitment would waste energy. A third possibility is that the lack of ability to store carrion reduces the benefit of collecting it in large quantities. If other food sources, such as nectar, were collected and stored, this argument may be supported.

== Queen relatedness ==
Queens of A. multipicta are highly related, a condition called oligogyny. Although it has not been directly studied for this species, a similar case of high queen relatedness in a multi-queen swarming species, Polybia emaciata, supports the cyclical oligogyny hypothesis. This hypothesis entails that the number of queens declines as colonies age, making the future queens more related to each other. Cyclical oligogyny may be influencing the relatedness of A. multipicta queens, but this requires species specific scientific investigation.

== Predation ==
Despite their ability to sting, wasp nests in the Neotropics are attacked by a variety of species including birds, bats, and capuchin monkeys. In Brazil, Galbula ruficauda is an avian predator that has been witnessed attacking A. multipicta when isolated from the nest, as when foraging. It is however thought to be relatively uncommon for animals to prey on solitary wasps.

== Roles in decomposition ==
A. multipicta and other wasps play an important role in the decomposition process, making holes and abrasions in carrion that allow other species access to further eat away the dead. However, by preying on fly larvae present on carrion, they are depleting other populations that are contributing to decomposition. Nevertheless, because of the demonstrated preference of this species for fresh carrion, which has less flies and fly larvae and more meat, the role of A. multipicta likely leads to greater decomposition overall.
