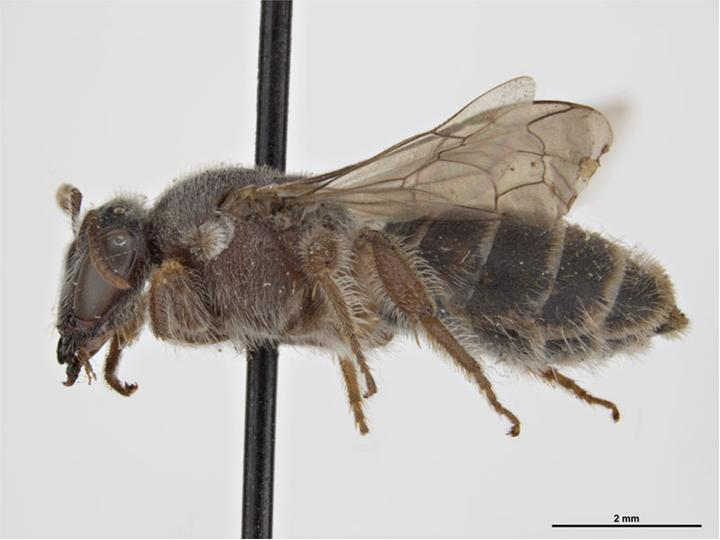
- Female

Scientific classification
- Kingdom: Animalia
- Phylum: Arthropoda
- Clade: Pancrustacea
- Class: Insecta
- Order: Hymenoptera
- Family: Colletidae
- Genus: Dasyhesma
- Species: D. robusta

Binomial name
- Dasyhesma robusta Michener, 1965

= Dasyhesma robusta =

Species of bee

Dasyhesma robusta is a species of bee in the family Colletidae and the subfamily Euryglossinae. It is endemic to Australia. It was described in 1965 by American entomologist Charles Duncan Michener.

== Distribution and habitat ==
The species occurs in south-west Western Australia. The type locality is Pearce, in the northern suburbs of Perth. Other published localities include Capel and Bullsbrook.

== Behaviour ==
The adults are flying mellivores.
