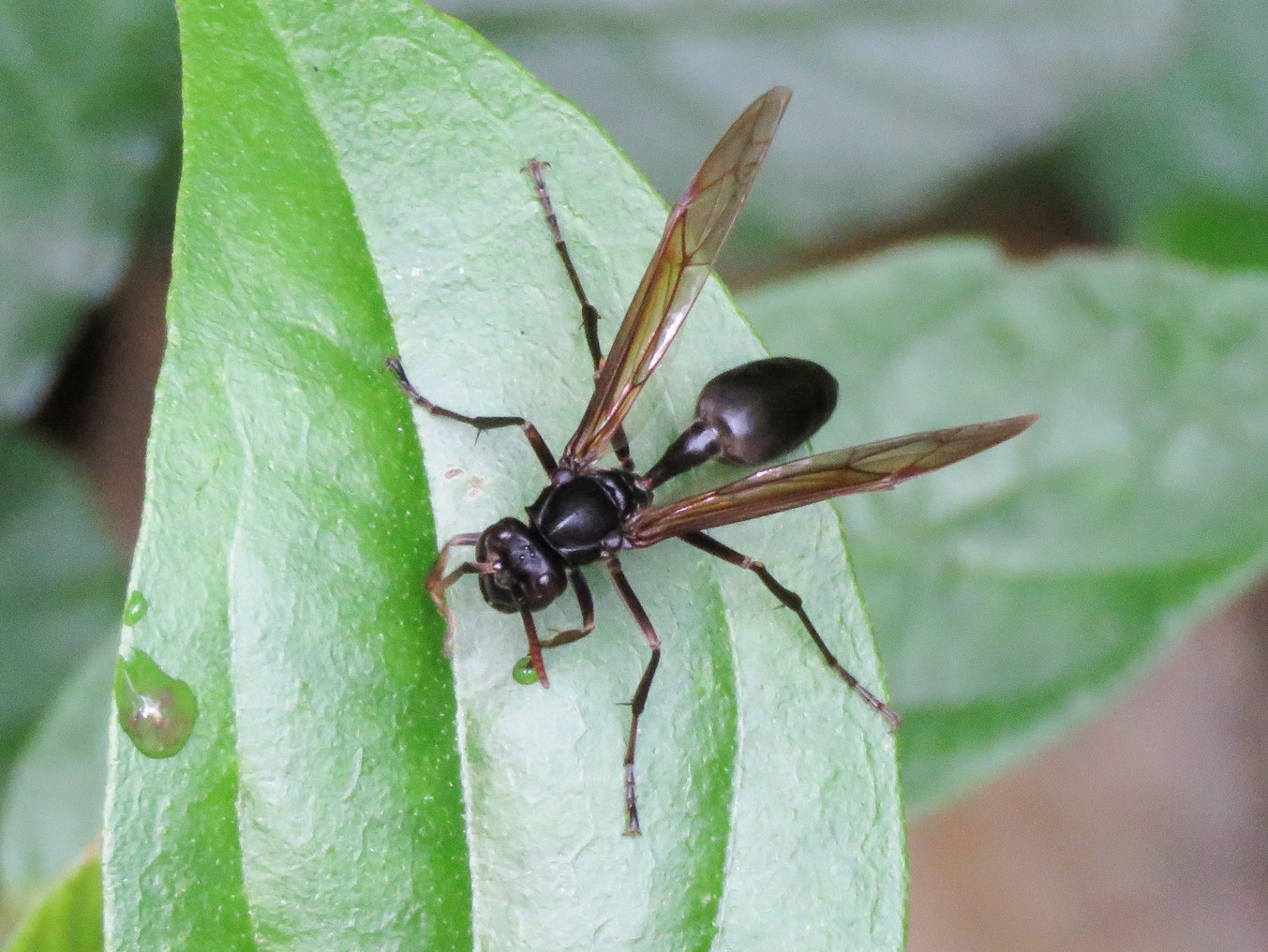
- Agelaia angulata

Scientific classification
- Kingdom: Animalia
- Phylum: Arthropoda
- Clade: Pancrustacea
- Class: Insecta
- Order: Hymenoptera
- Family: Vespidae
- Tribe: Epiponini
- Genus: Agelaia; Lepeletier, 1836

Type species
- Agelaia testacea (Fabricius, 1804)

Species
- 33 species

= Agelaia =

Genus of wasps

Agelaia is a genus of Neotropical social wasps (family Vespidae), with species from Mexico to northern Argentina. 17 of the 33 described species are found in Brazil. These species are swarm founders that nest in cavities. The nest generally is without an envelope, with that of A. areata a notable exception for having a complete envelope.

The main component of the venom is agelotoxin, a phospholipase A2 direct haemolysin.

== Species ==
There are 33 extant species of Agelaia:

- Agelaia acreana Silveira & Carpenter, 1996
- Agelaia anceps (de Saussure, 1854)
- Agelaia angulata (Fabricius, 1804)
- Agelaia angulicollis (Spinola, 1851)
- Agelaia areata (Say, 1837)
- Agelaia baezae (Richards, 1943)
- Agelaia bequaerti (Richards, 1951)
- Agelaia brevistigma (Richards, 1978)
- Agelaia cajennensis (Fabricius, 1798)
- Agelaia centralis (Cameron, 1907)
- Agelaia constructor (de Saussure, 1854)
- Agelaia cornelliana (Richards, 1943)
- Agelaia flavipennis (Ducke, 1905)
- Agelaia fulvofasciata (DeGeer, 1773)
- Agelaia hamiltoni (Richards, 1978)
- Agelaia imitatrix Cooper, 2001
- Agelaia lobipleura (Richards, 1978)
- Agelaia melanopyga Cooper, 2000
- Agelaia multipicta (Haliday, 1836)
- Agelaia myrmecophila (Ducke, 1905)
- Agelaia nebularum Cooper, 2000
- Agelaia nigrescens Cooper, 2001
- Agelaia ornata (Ducke, 1905)
- Agelaia pallidiventris (Richards, 1978)
- Agelaia pallipes (Oliver, 1792)
- Agelaia panamaensis (Cameron, 1906)
- Agelaia pleuralis Cooper, 2000
- Agelaia silvatica Cooper, 2000
- Agelaia testacea (Fabricius, 1804)
- Agelaia timida Cooper, 2000
- Agelaia vicina (de Saussure, 1854)
- Agelaia xanthopus (de Saussure, 1854)
- Agelaia yepocapa (Richards, 1978)
