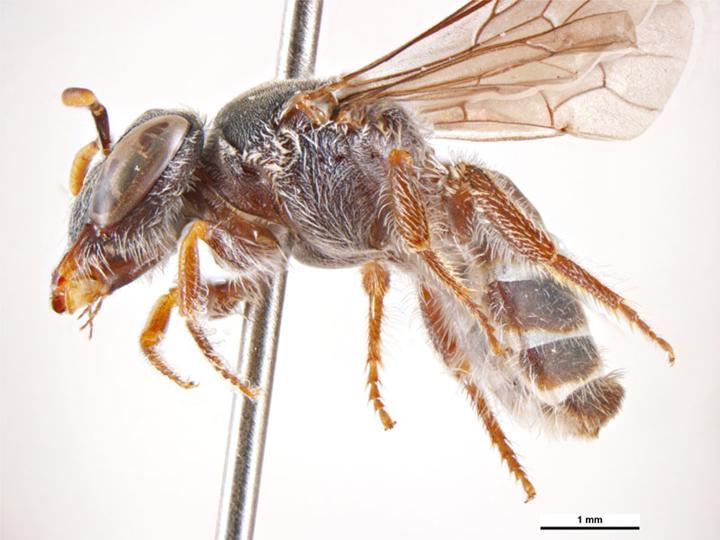
- Female

Scientific classification
- Kingdom: Animalia
- Phylum: Arthropoda
- Clade: Pancrustacea
- Class: Insecta
- Order: Hymenoptera
- Family: Colletidae
- Genus: Dasyhesma
- Species: D. scholtziae

Binomial name
- Dasyhesma scholtziae Exley, 2004

= Dasyhesma scholtziae =

Species of bee

Dasyhesma scholtziae is a species of bee in the family Colletidae and the subfamily Euryglossinae. It is endemic to Australia. It was described in 2004 by Australian entomologist Elizabeth Exley.

== Etymology ==
The specific epithet scholtziae refers to a favoured food plant.

== Description ==
Measurements of female specimens are: body length 8.0 mm, wing length 5.0 mm. Males: body length 5.5-6.0 mm, wing length 4.4 mm. Colouring is mainly dark brown to black.

== Distribution and habitat ==
The species occurs in south-western Western Australia. The type locality is Melaleuca Park Nature Reserve, 12 km north of Wanneroo, a suburb of Perth.

== Behaviour ==
The adults are flying mellivores. Flowering plants visited by the bees include Scholtzia species.

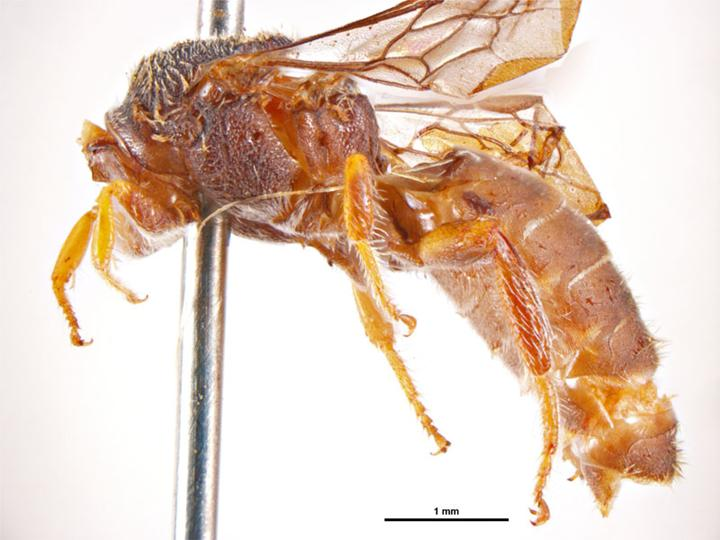
Male
