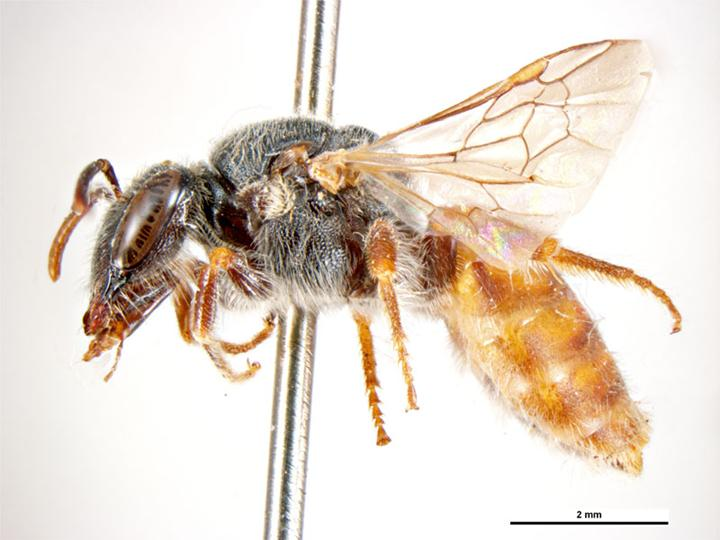
- Dasyhesma forrestii, female

Scientific classification
- Kingdom: Animalia
- Phylum: Arthropoda
- Clade: Pancrustacea
- Class: Insecta
- Order: Hymenoptera
- Superfamily: Apoidea
- Clade: Anthophila
- Family: Colletidae
- Subfamily: Euryglossinae
- Genus: Dasyhesma; Michener, 1965

= Dasyhesma =

Genus of bees

Dasyhesma is a genus of bees in the family Colletidae and the subfamily Euryglossinae. It is endemic to Australia. It was described in 1965 by American entomologist Charles Duncan Michener.

== Species ==
As of 2026 the genus contained 21 valid species:

- Dasyhesma abnormis (Rayment, 1935)
- Dasyhesma albula Exley, 2004
- Dasyhesma areola Exley, 2004
- Dasyhesma argentea Exley, 2004
- Dasyhesma aurea Exley, 2004
- Dasyhesma baeckea Exley, 2004
- Dasyhesma boharti Exley, 2004
- Dasyhesma brevipalpa Exley, 2004
- Dasyhesma clypeata Exley, 2004
- Dasyhesma coolgardensis Exley, 2004
- Dasyhesma depressa Exley, 2004
- Dasyhesma dilata Exley, 2004
- Dasyhesma forrestii Exley, 2004
- Dasyhesma galbina Exley, 2004
- Dasyhesma lepidophyllae Exley, 2004
- Dasyhesma muelleriana Exley, 2004
- Dasyhesma robusta Michener, 1965
- Dasyhesma scholtziae Exley, 2004
- Dasyhesma simulata Exley, 2004
- Dasyhesma spicata Exley, 2004
- Dasyhesma syntoma Exley, 2004
