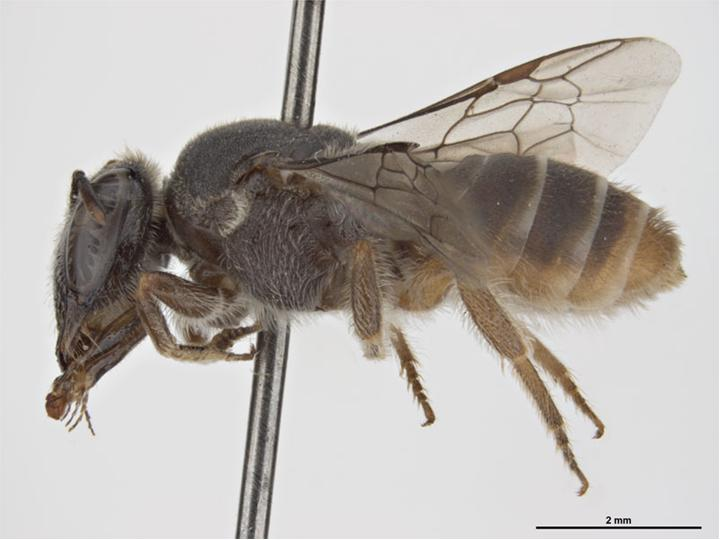
- Female

Scientific classification
- Kingdom: Animalia
- Phylum: Arthropoda
- Clade: Pancrustacea
- Class: Insecta
- Order: Hymenoptera
- Family: Colletidae
- Genus: Dasyhesma
- Species: D. abnormis

Binomial name
- Dasyhesma abnormis (Rayment, 1935)

Synonyms
- Euryglossimorpha abnormis Rayment, 1935

= Dasyhesma abnormis =

Species of bee

Dasyhesma abnormis is a species of bee in the family Colletidae and the subfamily Euryglossinae. It is endemic to Australia. It was described in 1935 by Australian entomologist Tarlton Rayment.

== Description ==
Body length of females is about 9 mm. Colouring is mainly black.

== Distribution and habitat ==
The species occurs in south-west Western Australia. The type locality is Gnangara, a suburb of Perth.

== Behaviour ==
The adults are flying mellivores.
