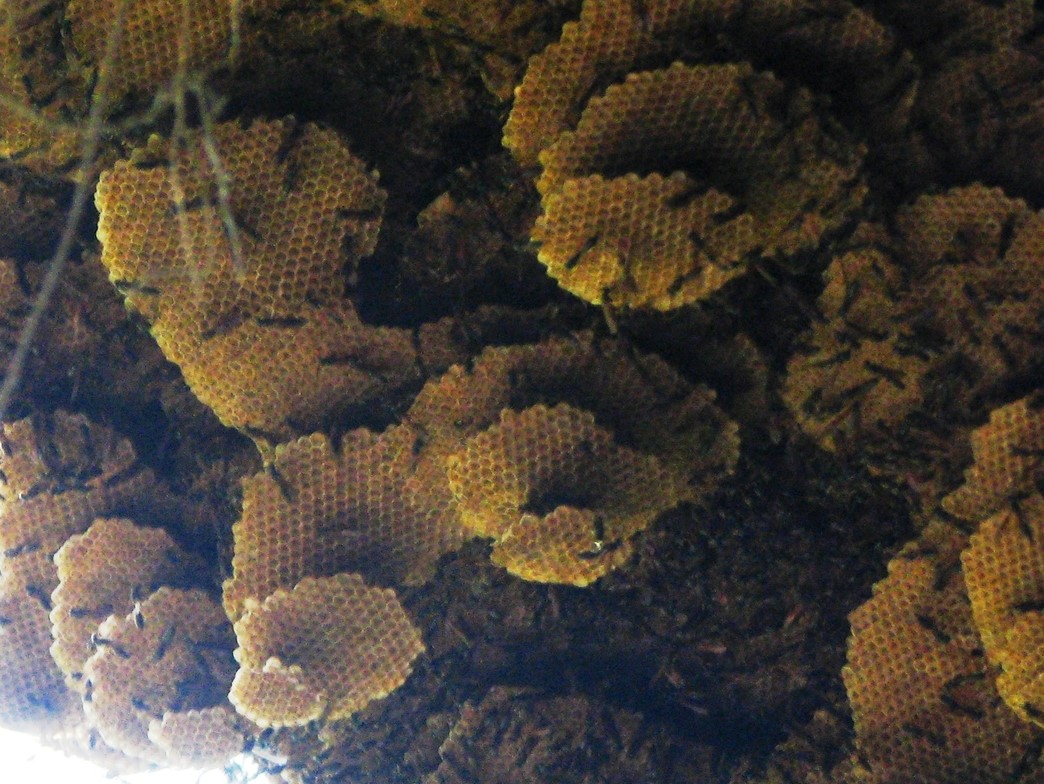
- On hive

Scientific classification
- Kingdom: Animalia
- Phylum: Arthropoda
- Class: Insecta
- Order: Hymenoptera
- Family: Vespidae
- Subfamily: Polistinae
- Tribe: Epiponini
- Genus: Agelaia
- Species: A. vicina

Binomial name
- Agelaia vicina (de Saussure, 1854)

= Agelaia vicina =

Species of wasp

Agelaia vicina is a species of wasp in the genus Agelaia. They are neotropical social wasps known to have the largest colony sizes and nest sizes among social wasps, with some colonies exceeding over one million individuals. They are predators of land arthropods, consuming both insects and spiders alike. Recent sperm morphology studies have shown that although Vespidae belong to the superfamily Vespoidea, A. vicina may be more phylogenetically related to Apoidea.

== Taxonomy and phylogenetics ==
A. vicina is a eusocial, swarming member of the subfamily Polistinae, within the tribe Epiponini. The genus Agelaia, includes nine species: A. flavipennis, A. areata, A. angulicollis, A. cajennensis, A. fulvofasciata, A. myrmecophila, A. pallipes, A. yepocapa and A. panamaensis.

=== Sperm morphology ===
By analyzing the ultrastructure of A. vicina sperm and comparing it to samples from other species within its superfamily, Vespidae, it has been found that A. vicina may be more closely linked to Apoidea than to Vespidae phylogenetically.

== Description and identification ==
=== Appearance ===
Queens of the species are characterized by smaller heads and larger abdomens relative to workers.

=== Nest structure ===
A. vicina are known to create outstandingly large nests. The combs themselves are generally horizontal and fairly even, neither convex nor concave. The cells face downward and comb layers are vertically connected by petioles. The bottom combs resemble stratified layers while the top combs expand concentrically to form a singular huge comb. When there are spatial limitations the top most layer stops concentrically expanding, leaving the final shape of the nest to be ellipsoid. The brood is always concentrated near the center of the nest, while peripheral cells are left empty as a means of enveloping the structure.

The nests are built out of foraged plant fibers.

== Distribution and habitat ==
A. vicina are nest-dwelling species. Colonies may build their nests in sheltered, half-exposed, or fully exposed areas. Their distribution is essentially limited to the neotropical region. The species is common relative to its genus due to the characteristic rapid growth of its colonies.

A. vicina is found in Southern Brazil and their nests have been studied in the states of São Paulo and Minas Gerais.

== Colony cycle ==
A. vicina are a swarm-founding species, therefore initiation of a new colony involves a large group of workers and one or more queens. Initial construction of the nest is rapid. However, unlike most swarm-founding species where nest growth is episodic, A. vicina continuously increases the size of its nest. Growth rates have been observed in which the nest size doubles after six months. A. vicina are known to have the largest colony size among social wasps, as colonies may exceed one million adults. They also have a very high brood production rate of several thousand individuals per day. In the dry season there is a large population increase soon followed by reproductive swarming, leading to a steep decline in colony size. During the rainy season, decreases in the production of workers are believed to be due to difficulties in obtaining food.

== Behavior ==
=== Recruitment to food ===
All species of the genus Agelaia, including A. vicina lack the characteristic of actively recruiting nestmates to discover sources of food. It appears the most effective foraging strategy for the genus is for individuals to scramble for food on their own. The reason behind this is that when foragers work at the individual level, they are able to exploit the resources in that area more quickly and efficiently than if they took time to recruit nest mates to that area or tried to defend the area from non-nestmates. By behaving as opportunistic, solitary foragers they regularly find untouched food patches and exploit them as rapidly as possible until they are driven out by predators. As a corollary, this means that individuals of the species do not maintain specific foraging territories.

== Interaction with other species ==
=== Diet ===
A. vicina have a broad diet relative to other social wasps. Colonies forage for water, plant tissue, protein and carbohydrates. Protein is acquired through the general predation of land arthropods. A. vicina are known to prey most heavily on insects of the order Lepidoptera and Coleoptera. Additionally, spiders are a staple of their diet. The species also consumes insects of the order Dermaptera, Hymenoptera, Heteroptera, Mantodea, Diptera, Neuroptera, Blattodae and Homoptera.

=== Predators ===
Much more work has yet to be done on the subject, but it is known that the jacamar Galbula ruficauda may prey on A. vicina when they are away from their nest. The bird does so by first catching the wasp and then beating it on a branch before swallowing it whole.

=== Defense ===
For the duration of the activity period of the colony, most flights that exit the nest are short and unrelated to foraging. However, with a large collection of individuals making these trips at once, a persisting cloud forms. This cloud surrounds the exposed aspect of the nest. It is hypothesized that one of the main functions of this cloud is to block the approach of predators and parasites.

=== Keystone species ===
A keystone species is one that affects several organisms in an ecosystem, leading to effects much greater than the species's own proportional abundance. A. vicina has been labeled a keystone species due to their unparalleled nest size, colony size, and high rate of brood production. The diversity of their prey and the immense quantity that is necessary to sustain this high rate of growth affects local populations of these species.

== Human importance ==
=== Stings ===
A. vicina stings can lead to intense allergy, anaphylactic reactions, and even death in humans.

=== Neurotoxins in A. vicina venom ===
Much research has been done in isolating and understanding the effective aspects of A. vicina venom. A recent study involving Wistar rats involved isolating the neurotoxin AvTx8 and then microinjecting it into the brains of rats to understand its effect on brain activity. It was found that the neurotoxin has effects on GABAergic neurotransmission, increasing the activity of specific inhibitory pathways. By doing so, it reduces defensive behavior in rats by propagating an anti-panic effect. The study suggests that AcTx8, as well as many of the other chemicals found in A. vicina venom, may be used to study mechanisms of the brain and brainstem networks.
