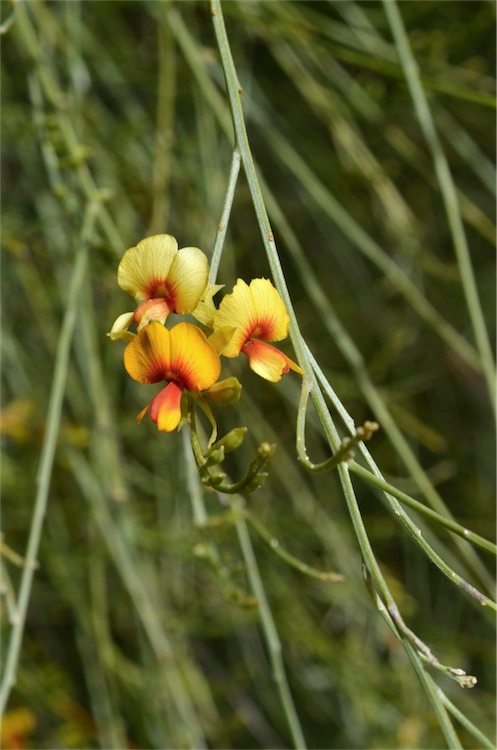
- Cultivated specimen

Scientific classification
- Kingdom: Plantae
- Clade: Tracheophytes
- Clade: Angiosperms
- Clade: Eudicots
- Clade: Rosids
- Order: Fabales
- Family: Fabaceae
- Subfamily: Faboideae
- Genus: Jacksonia
- Species: J. cupulifera

Binomial name
- Jacksonia cupulifera Meisn.

Synonyms
- Jacksonia scoparia var. macrocarpa Benth.; Piptomeris cupulifera (Meisn.) Greene

= Jacksonia cupulifera =

Species of legume

Jacksonia cupulifera is a species of flowering plant in the family Fabaceae and is endemic to the north-west of Western Australia. It is an erect shrub or weeping tree with sharply-pointed phylloclades, its leaves reduced to scales and yellow-orange flowers scattered along the branches.

== Description ==
Jacksonia cupulifera is an erect shrub or weeping tree that typically grows up to 1.2–7 m (3 ft 11 in – 23 ft 0 in) high and 2 m (6 ft 7 in) wide. It has greyish green branches, the end branches sharply pointed phylloclades, its leaves reduced to scales, 0.4–2 mm (0.016–0.079 in) long and 0.4–1.1 mm (0.016–0.043 in) wide. The flowers are scattered along the branches, each flower on a pedicel 3.6–6 mm (0.14–0.24 in) long, with egg-shaped bracteoles 0.40–0.95 mm (0.016–0.037 in) long and 0.34–0.4 mm (0.013–0.016 in) wide but that usually fall off as the flowers open. The floral tube is 1.0–1.1 mm (0.039–0.043 in) long and the sepals are membraneous, with upper lobes 7.7–8.5 mm (0.30–0.33 in) long and 1.3–1.5 mm (0.051–0.059 in) wide, the lower lobes shorter and narrower. The flowers are yellow-orange, the standard petal 8.2–9.5 mm (0.32–0.37 in) long and 10.9–14 mm (0.43–0.55 in) wide, the wings 8.3–9 mm (0.33–0.35 in) long, and the keel 6.8–7.2 mm (0.27–0.28 in) long. The stamens have white and pale pink filaments and are 5.5–8 mm (0.22–0.31 in) long. Flowering occurs from July to October, and the fruit is a woody, hairy pod 10.5–16 mm (0.41–0.63 in) long and about 5.5 mm (0.22 in) wide.

== Taxonomy ==
Jacksonia cupulifera was first formally described in 1855 by Carl Meissner in his Botanische Zeitung from specimens collected by James Drummond. The specific epithet (cupulifera) means 'cup-bearing', referring to the base of the sepals when the tips have fallen.

== Distribution and habitat ==
This species of Jacksonia grows in shrubland on sand over laterite or sandstone, from the Kalbarri National Park to Walkaway in the Geraldton Sandplains bioregion in the north-west of Western Australia.

== Conservation status ==
This species is listed as "not threatened" by the Government of Western Australia Department of Biodiversity, Conservation and Attractions.
