= Eurardy Reserve =

Protected area in Western Australia

- Location within Western Australia
- Location: Western Australia
- Nearest city: Geraldton, Western Australia
- Coordinates: 27.539°S 114.645°E
- Area: 29,943 ha (115.61 sq mi)
- Established: 2005
- Governing body: Bush Heritage Australia
- Website: Official website

Eurardy Reserve is a 30,050-hectare (74,300-acre) nature reserve in Western Australia. It is 145 kilometres (90 mi) north of Geraldton, 275 kilometres (171 mi) south of Carnarvon and 530 kilometres (330 mi) north of Perth. It lies on the northern edge of the South West Botanical Province, adjoining Kalbarri National Park, and is owned and managed by Bush Heritage Australia (BHA), by which it was purchased in 2005.

== Landscape and vegetation ==
The reserve has a flat relief supporting vegetation associations of high conservation value, including Mallalie (Eucalyptus eudesmoides, bowgada and jam scrub with York gum and red mallee woodlands. It is well known for its display of spring wildflowers.

== Fauna ==
Mammals historically present on the property include the numbat, bilby, burrowing bettong, western barred bandicoot and chuditch. Although these became locally extinct, recent reintroductions into Kalbarri National Park may herald a return to the reserve. Other animals known to be present include spinifex hopping mouse, thorny devil, fat-tailed and hairy-footed dunnarts, eastern grey kangaroo, emu and euro.
