= Mesosoma =

Anthropod body part

The mesosoma is the middle part of the body, or tagma, of arthropods whose body is composed of three parts, the other two being the prosoma and the metasoma. It bears the legs, and, in the case of winged insects, the wings.

== Wasps, bees and ants ==
In hymenopterans of the suborder Apocrita (wasps, bees and ants), the mesosoma consists of the three thoracic segments and the first abdominal segment (the propodeum). For historical reasons, in ants it is commonly referred to by the alternative name alitrunk.

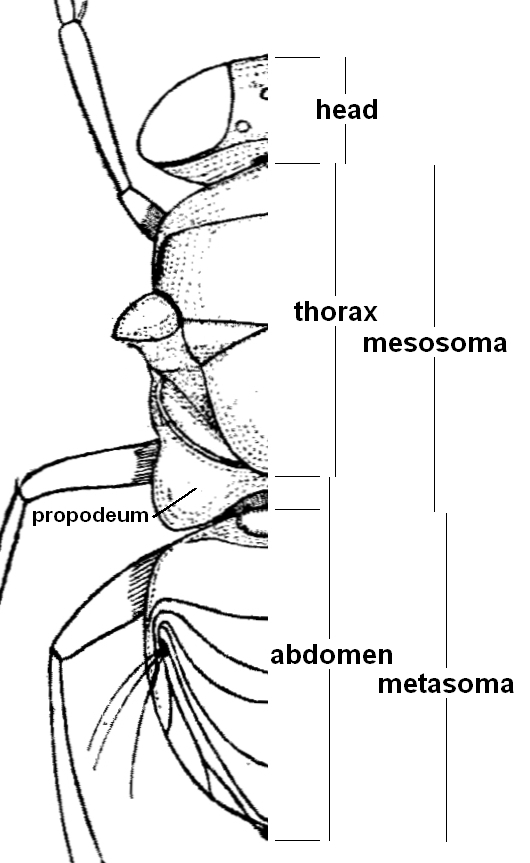
The mesosoma (thorax plus propodeum) and metasoma (remaining segments of the abdomen) of an encyrtid wasp.

In the worker ant the mesosoma includes the pronotum, mesonotum, scutellum and the propodeum. The petiole and the gaster comprise the metasoma.

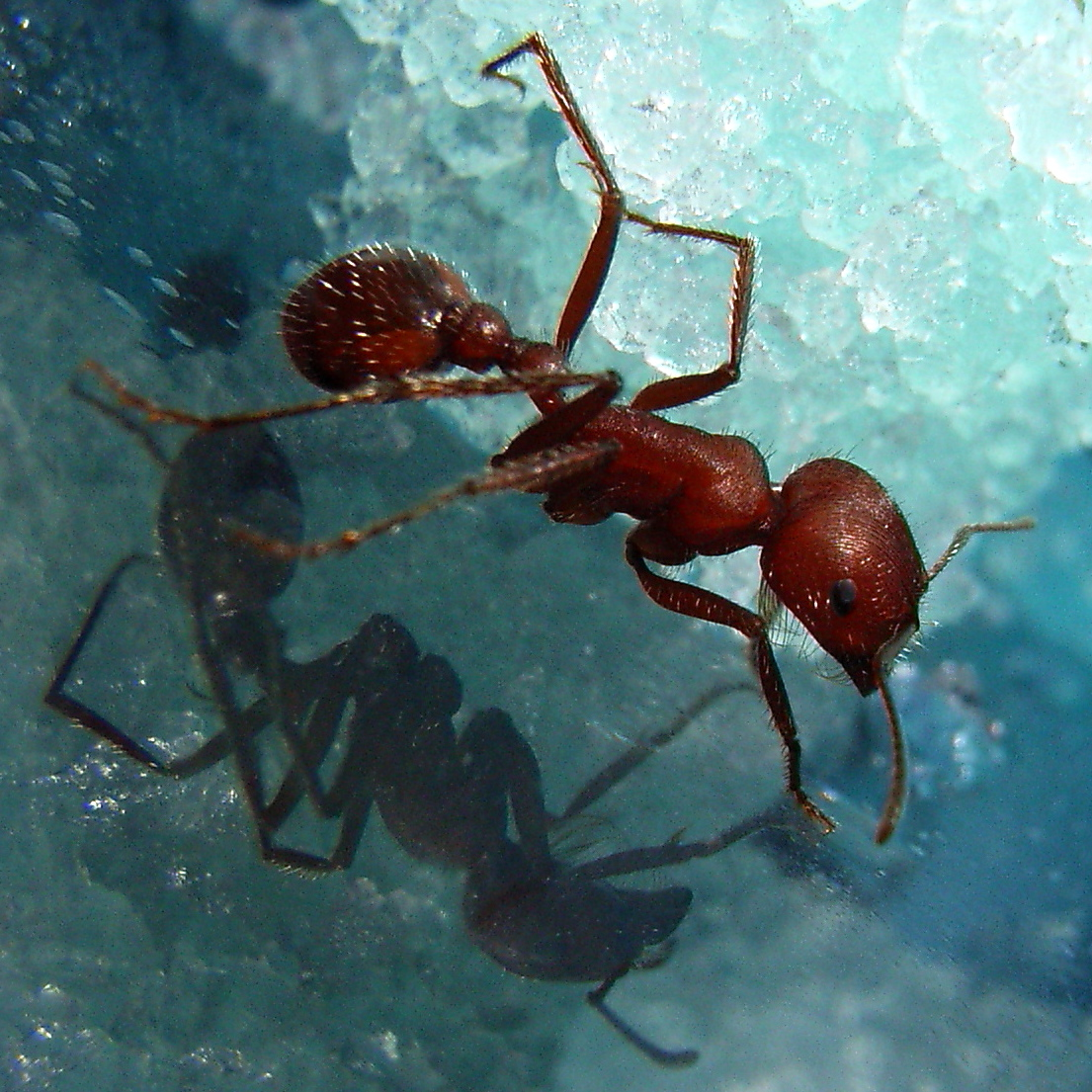
The mesosoma is clearly visible on this ant: it is the middle section, in between the head and the petiole

== Arachnids ==
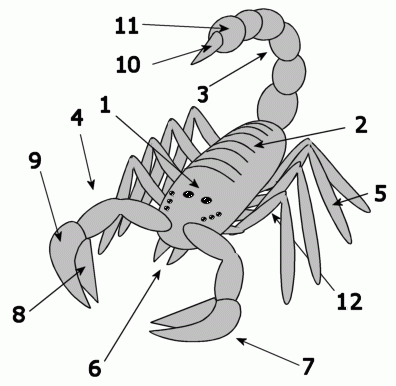
Scorpion anatomy: 1 = Prosoma; 2 = Mesosoma; 3 = Metasoma

In scorpions, the mesosoma is composed of six segments and forms the first part of the abdomen, containing all of the major organs. The first segment contains the sexual organs as well as a pair of vestigial and modified appendages forming a structure called the genital operculum. The second segment bears a pair of featherlike sensory organs known as the pectines; the final four segments each contain a pair of book lungs. The mesosoma is armoured with chitinous plates, on the upper surface by the tergites and on the lower surface by the sternites.

In other arachnids such as spiders, the mesosoma is fused with the metasoma to form the opisthosoma.
