= Metasoma =

Body part of insects

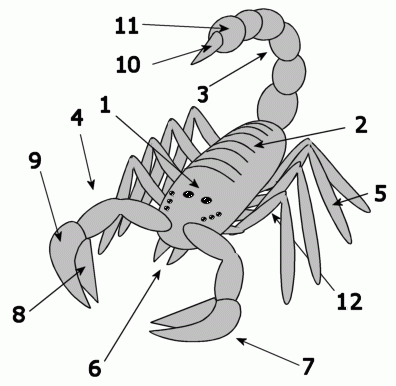
Scorpion anatomy: 1 = prosoma; 2 = mesosoma; 3 = metasoma

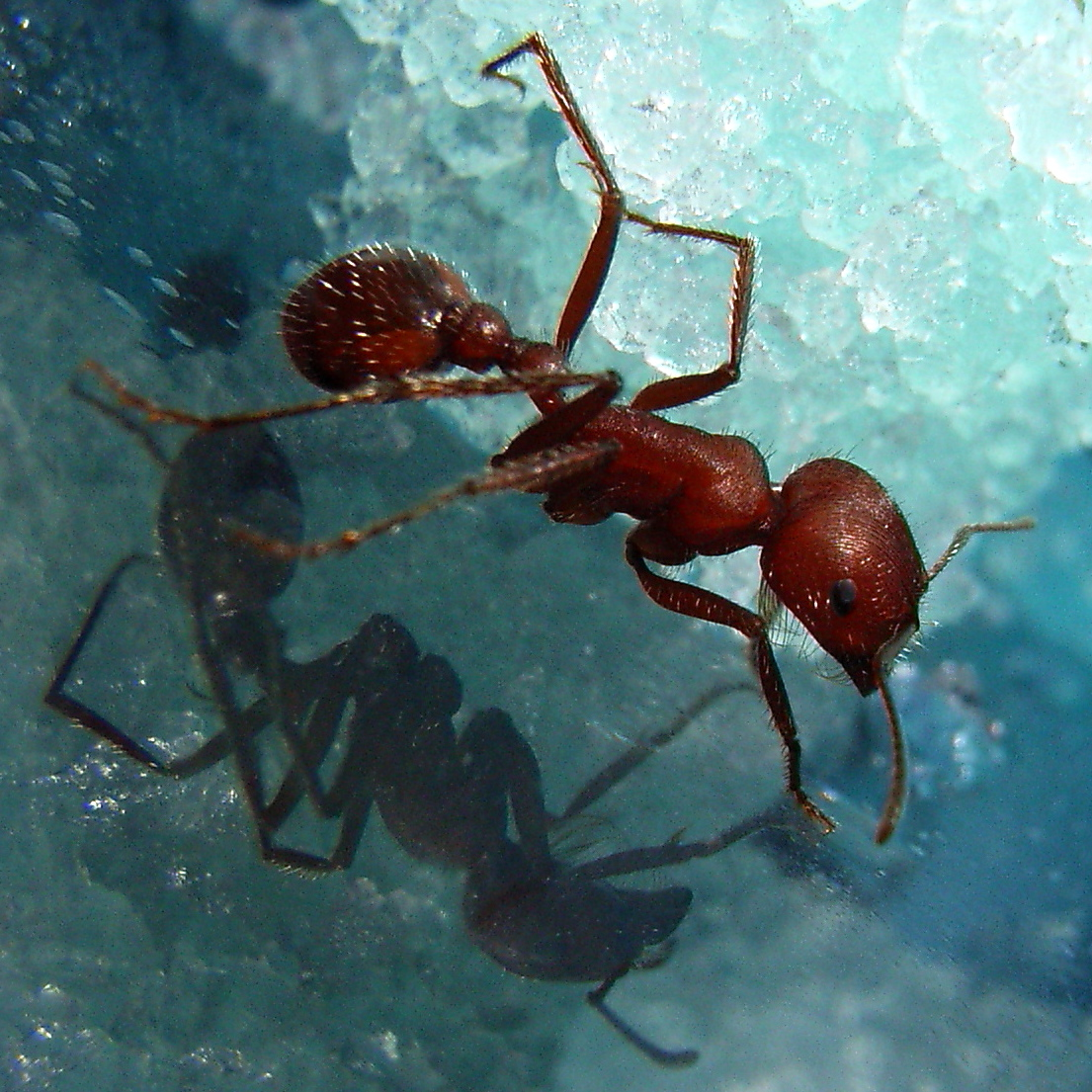
The metasoma is clearly visible on this ant: it is the posterior section, including the petiole.

The metasoma is the posterior part of the body, or tagma, of arthropods whose body is composed of three parts, the other two being the prosoma and the mesosoma. In insects, it contains most of the digestive tract, respiratory system, and circulatory system, and the apical segments are typically modified to form genitalia. In a few of the most primitive insects (the Archaeognatha), the metasomal segments bear small, articulated appendages called "styli", which are often considered to be vestigial. There are also pre-apical appendages in most insect orders, called cerci, which may be multi-segmented and almost resembling a posterior pair of antennae; these may be variously modified, or lost entirely. Otherwise, most adult insects lack appendages on the metasoma, though many larval insects (e.g., caterpillars) have some form of appendages, such as prolegs or, in aquatic insects, gills.

In apocritan Hymenoptera (wasps, bees and ants), the metasoma consists of the second abdominal segment (which typically forms a petiole) and those segments posterior to it, and is often called the gaster rather than referring to it as the "abdomen"; in these insects, the first abdominal segment is called the propodeum and is fused to the thorax. The metasoma is armoured with chitinous plates on the upper surface by the tergites and on the lower surface by the sternites.

In scorpions, the metasoma is the tail. In other chelicerates, such as spiders, the mesosoma is fused with the metasoma to form the opisthosoma.
