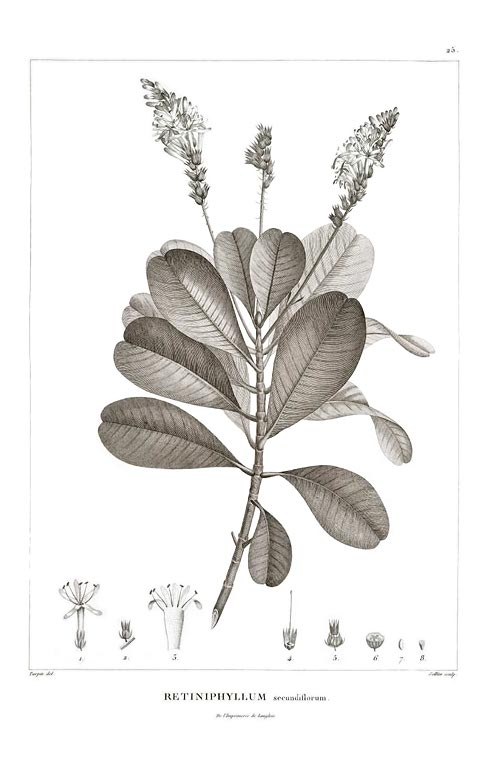
- Retiniphyllum secundiflorum

Scientific classification
- Kingdom: Plantae
- Clade: Tracheophytes
- Clade: Angiosperms
- Clade: Eudicots
- Clade: Asterids
- Order: Gentianales
- Family: Rubiaceae
- Subfamily: Ixoroideae
- Tribe: Retiniphylleae; Hook.f.
- Genus: Retiniphyllum; Humb. & Bonpl.

Type species
- Retiniphyllum secundiflorum Humb. & Bonpl.

Synonyms
- Commianthus Benth.; Synisoon Baill.

= Retiniphyllum =

Genus of flowering plants

Retiniphyllum is a genus of flowering plants in the family Rubiaceae and contains 20 species. It is the only genus in the tribe Retiniphylleae. The representatives are shrubs or small trees that grow in white sand soils in tropical South America. They are mainly distributed in the Guayana Region (Venezuela) but also occur in the Amazon Basin, the eastern Andes and central and eastern Brasil.

== Description ==
The species exhibit a character that is not common in the family Rubiaceae, viz. the presence of two collateral and pendulous ovules per locule. The shrubs or trees have apical buds with abundant resin. Each flower is subtended by a bracteole and the corollas are contorted. Stamens are reflexed in anthesis and have basal and apical sterile appendages. Many species also exhibit secondary pollen presentation. The 5-locular ovary contains two ovules per locule. The drupaceous fruits contain pyrenes with one seed due to the abortion of one ovule.

== Taxonomy ==
Retiniphyllum was placed in the subfamily Rubioideae in the earliest systems of classification due to the misinterpretation of the bi-ovulated locules. William Jackson Hooker established the tribe Retiniphylleae in 1873 and included the genera Retiniphyllum and Kutchubaea. The classification of the group remained difficult for a long time, which resulted in the placement of the genus Retiniphyllum in different tribes and subfamilies of Rubiaceae. Molecular studies place the genus in an isolated clade of the Ixoroideae related to paleotropical representatives. The monophyly of the tribe Retiniphylleae has been confirmed and the tribe is placed as a clade within the subfamily Ixoroideae.

The genera Botryarrhena and Scyphiphora were tentatively included in the tribe Retiniphylleae by Robbrecht (1988). However, molecular data suggest that neither are related to Retiniphyllum. Botryarrhena is resolved within the Alibertia group, sister to Stachyarrhena in a clade with the genera Alibertia, Borojoa and Kutchubaea. The monotypic genus Scyphiphora is sister to a clade that includes the tribe Ixoreae and Vanguerieae.

== Species ==
- Retiniphyllum cataractae Ducke
- Retiniphyllum chloranthum Ducke
- Retiniphyllum concolor (Spruce ex Benth.) Müll.Arg.
- Retiniphyllum discolor (Spruce ex Benth.) Müll.Arg.
- Retiniphyllum fuchsioides K.Krause
- Retiniphyllum glabrum Steyerm.
- Retiniphyllum guianense Steyerm.
- Retiniphyllum kuhlmannii Standl.
- Retiniphyllum laxiflorum (Benth.) N.E.Br.
- Retiniphyllum longiflorum Steyerm.
- Retiniphyllum maguirei Standl.
- Retiniphyllum parvifolium Steyerm.
- Retiniphyllum pauciflorum Kunth ex K.Krause
- Retiniphyllum pilosum (Spruce ex Benth.) Müll.Arg.
- Retiniphyllum scabrum Benth.
- Retiniphyllum schomburgkii (Benth.) Müll.Arg.
- Retiniphyllum secundiflorum Humb. & Bonpl.
- Retiniphyllum speciosum (Spruce ex Benth.) Müll.Arg.
- Retiniphyllum tepuiense Steyerm.
- Retiniphyllum truncatum Müll.Arg.
