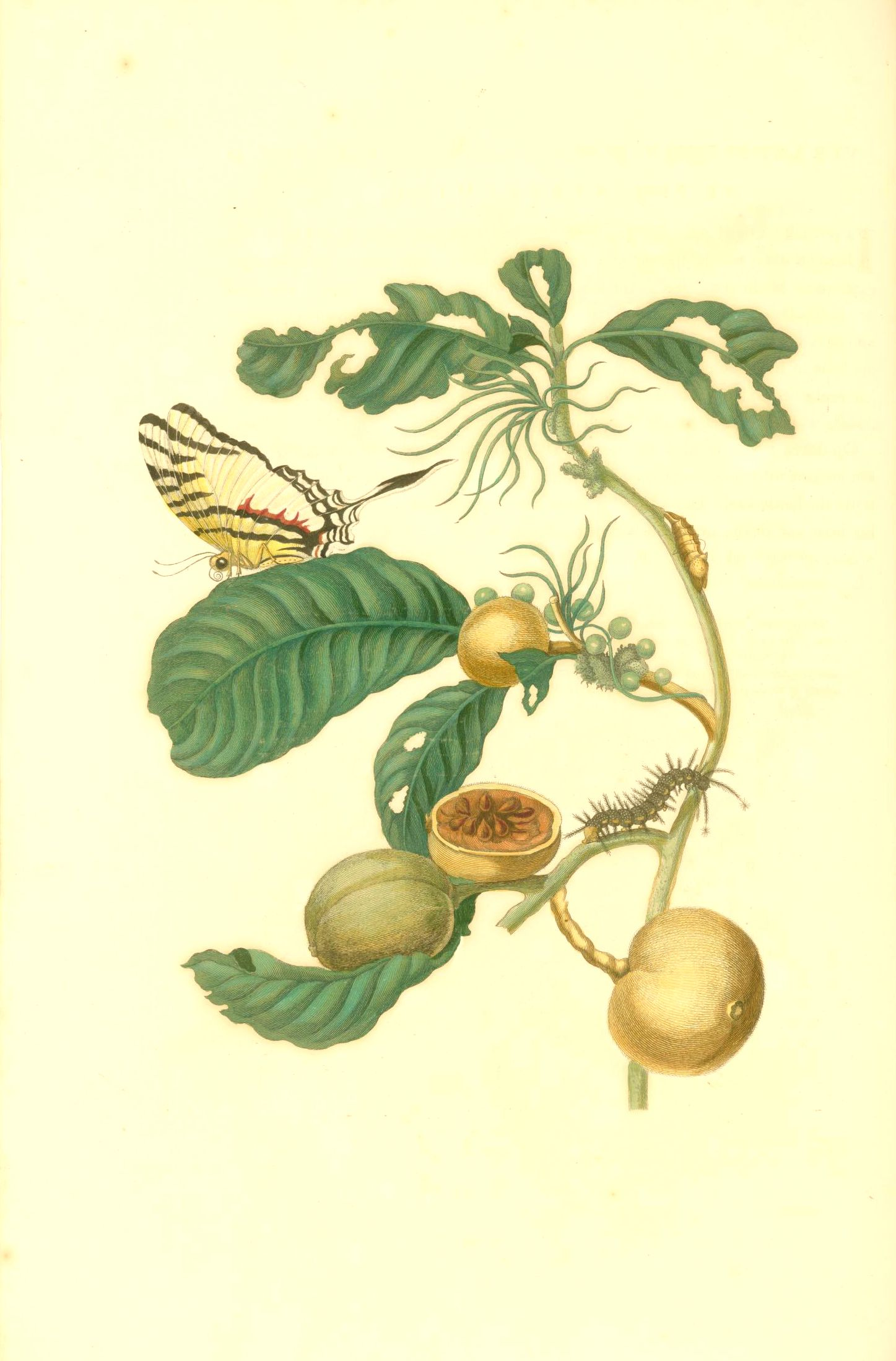
- Duroia sp. by Maria Sybilla Merian

Scientific classification
- Kingdom: Plantae
- Clade: Tracheophytes
- Clade: Angiosperms
- Clade: Eudicots
- Clade: Asterids
- Order: Gentianales
- Family: Rubiaceae
- Subfamily: Ixoroideae
- Tribe: Cordiereae
- Genus: Duroia; L.f.

Type species
- Duroia eriopila L.f.

Synonyms
- Coupoui Aubl.; Pubeta L.; Cupuia Raf.; Schachtia H.Karst.; Cupirana Miers

= Duroia =

Genus of plants

Duroia is a genus of flowering plants in the family Rubiaceae. The genus is found from Costa Rica to tropical South America.

== Ecology ==
A number of Duroia species, and possibly all, are capable of biochemical interactions inhibiting the growth of neighbouring plants. Analysis of root extracts from Duroia hirsuta have yielded a strong plant growth inhibitor plumericin, a tetracyclic iridoid lactone. This process, common amongst plants, is termed allelopathy. In the case of Duroia hirsuta, the chemical inhibitor is aided by the leafcutter ant Myrmelachista schumanni resident on and in the tree, and playing an active role in suppressing and destroying plant growth in the vicinity of their host by injecting and spraying formic acid. The area around the understory species Duroia hirsuta is often devoid of all other plant types, leading to the local name 'Devil's garden'. The cost to the host plant for this protection is considerable, since the resident ants subject the tree to increased leaf cutting.

== Species ==
- Duroia amapana Steyerm.
- Duroia aquatica (Aubl.) Bremek.
- Duroia bolivarensis Steyerm.
- Duroia costaricensis Standl.
- Duroia duckei Huber
- Duroia eriopila L.f.
- Duroia fusifera Spruce ex K.Schum.
- Duroia genipoides Spruce ex K.Schum.
- Duroia gransabanensis Steyerm.
- Duroia hirsuta (Poepp.) K.Schum.
- Duroia hirsutissima Steyerm.
- Duroia kotchubioides Steyerm.
- Duroia laevis Devia Perss. & C.M.Taylor
- Duroia longiflora Ducke
- Duroia longifolia (Poepp.) K.Schum.
- Duroia macrophylla Huber
- Duroia maguirei Steyerm.
- Duroia martiniana (Miers) Bremek.
- Duroia melinonii Standl.
- Duroia merumensis Steyerm.
- Duroia micrantha (Ladbr.) Zarucchi & J.H.Kirkbr.
- Duroia nitida Steyerm.
- Duroia palustris Ducke
- Duroia paraensis Ducke
- Duroia paruensis Steyerm.
- Duroia petiolaris Spruce ex K.Schum.
- Duroia plicata Benoist
- Duroia prancei Steyerm.
- Duroia retrorsipila Steyerm.
- Duroia saccifera (Mart. ex Schult. & Schult.f.) K.Schum.
- Duroia sancti-ciprianii Devia Perss. & C.M.Taylor
- Duroia soejartoi D.R.Simpson
- Duroia steinbachii Standl.
- Duroia strigosa Steyerm.
- Duroia trichocarpa Standl.
- Duroia triflora Ducke
- Duroia valesca C.H.Perss. & Delprete
- Duroia velutina Hook.f. ex K.Schum.
