= Cordiereae =

Scientific classification
- Kingdom: Plantae
- Clade: Tracheophytes
- Clade: Angiosperms
- Clade: Eudicots
- Clade: Asterids
- Order: Gentianales
- Family: Rubiaceae
- Subfamily: Ixoroideae
- Tribe: Cordiereae; A.Rich. ex DC. emend. Mouly

Type genus
- Cordiera A.Rich. ex DC.

Tribe of angiosperms

Cordiereae is a tribe of flowering plants in the family Rubiaceae and contains 124 species in 12 genera. Its representatives are found in central and southern tropical America.

== Genera ==
Currently accepted names

- Agouticarpa C.H.Perss. (7 sp)
- Alibertia A.Rich. ex DC. (25 sp)
- Amaioua Aubl. (9 sp)
- Botryarrhena Ducke (2 sp)
- Cordiera A.Rich. ex DC. (11 sp)
- Duroia L.f. (38 sp)
- Glossostipula Lorence (3 sp)
- Kutchubaea Fisch. ex DC. (13 sp)
- Melanopsidium Colla (1 sp)
- Riodocea Delprete (1 sp)
- Stachyarrhena Hook.f. (13 sp)
- Stenosepala C.H.Perss. (1 sp)

Synonyms

- Borojoa Cuatrec. = Alibertia
- Coupoui Aubl. = Duroia
- Cupirana Miers = Duroia
- Cupuia Raf. = Duroia
- Ehrenbergia Spreng. = Amaioua
- Einsteinia Ducke = Kutchubaea
- Garapatica H.Karst. = Alibertia
- Gardeniola Cham. = Alibertia
- Genipella A.Rich. ex DC. = Alibertia
- Hexactina Willd. ex Schult. & Schult.f. = Amaioua
- Ibetralia Bremek. = Kutchubaea
- Kotchubaea Regel ex Benth. = Kutchubaea
- Pubeta L. = Duroia
- Scepseothamnus Cham. = Alibertia
- Schachtia H.Karst. = Duroia
- Thieleodoxa Cham. = Alibertia
