= Agouticarpa =

Scientific classification
- Kingdom: Plantae
- Clade: Embryophytes
- Clade: Tracheophytes
- Clade: Spermatophytes
- Clade: Angiosperms
- Clade: Eudicots
- Clade: Asterids
- Order: Gentianales
- Family: Rubiaceae
- Subfamily: Ixoroideae
- Tribe: Cordiereae
- Genus: Agouticarpa; C.H.Perss.

Type species
- Agouticarpa williamsii (Standl.) C.H.Perss.

Genus of plants

Agouticarpa is a genus of flowering plants in the family Rubiaceae. It was described by Claes Persson in 2003. The genus is found from Costa Rica to Bolivia.

== Description ==
Agouticarpa is characterized by being dioecious, having elliptic to obovate, membranaceous stipules, male flowers in a branched dichasial or thyrse-like inflorescence, a poorly developed cup-shaped calyx, pollen grains with 3-7 apertures, and large globose fruits.

== Species ==
- Agouticarpa curviflora (Dwyer) C.H.Perss. - Panama to Bolivia
- Agouticarpa grandistipula C.H.Perss. - Ecuador
- Agouticarpa hirsuta C.H.Perss. - Ecuador
- Agouticarpa isernii (Standl.) C.H.Perss. - Ecuador, Colombia, Peru
- Agouticarpa spinosa C.H.Perss. & Delprete - Peru
- Agouticarpa velutina C.H.Perss. - Ecuador, Peru
- Agouticarpa williamsii (Standl.) C.H.Perss. - Costa Rica, Panama, Colombia, Ecuador
