= Mutualism (biology) =

Mutually beneficial interaction between species

Hummingbird hawkmoth drinking from Dianthus, with pollination being a classic example of mutualism

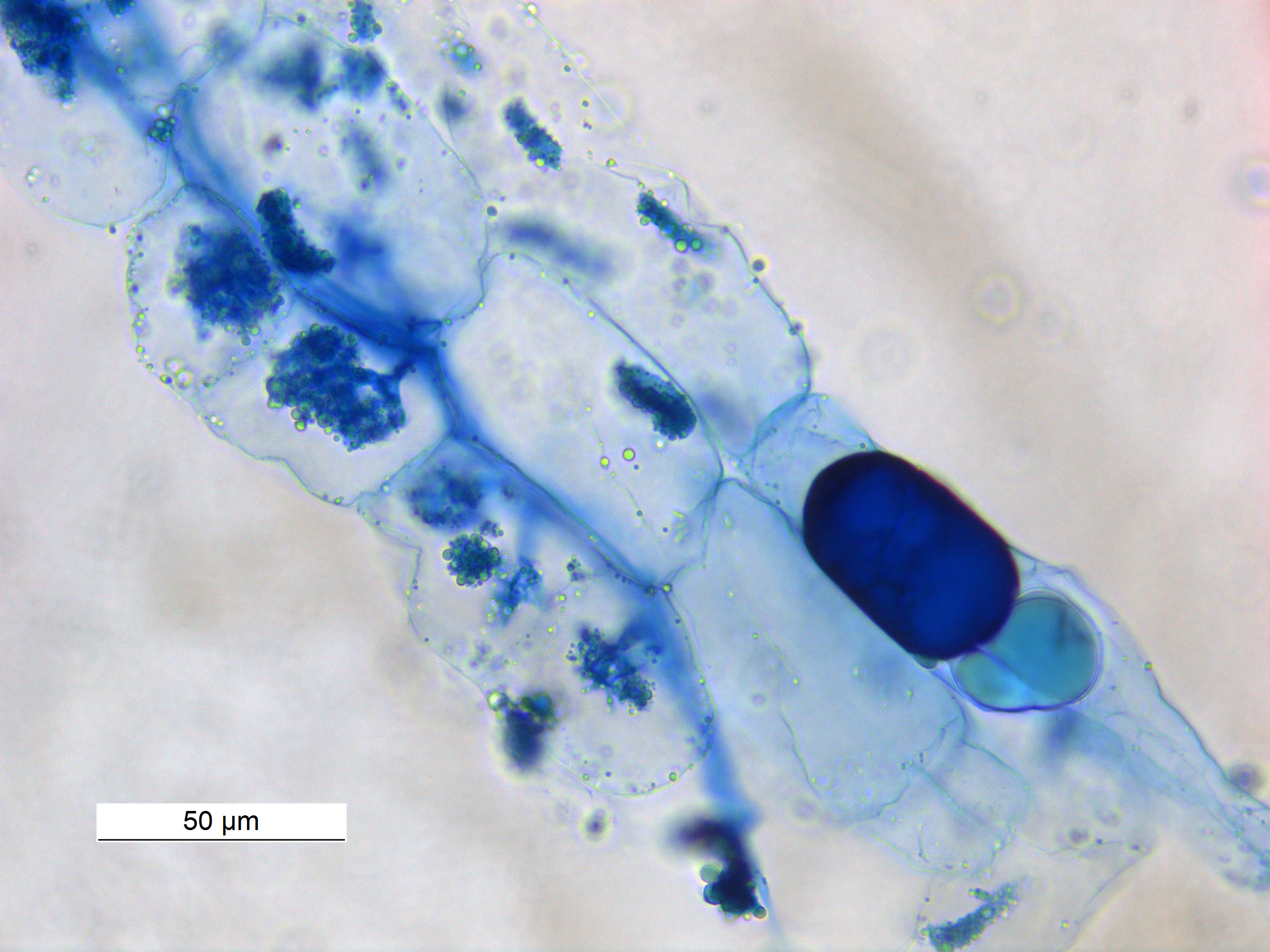
Arbuscular mycorrhizae forms mutualistic symbiosis with plants

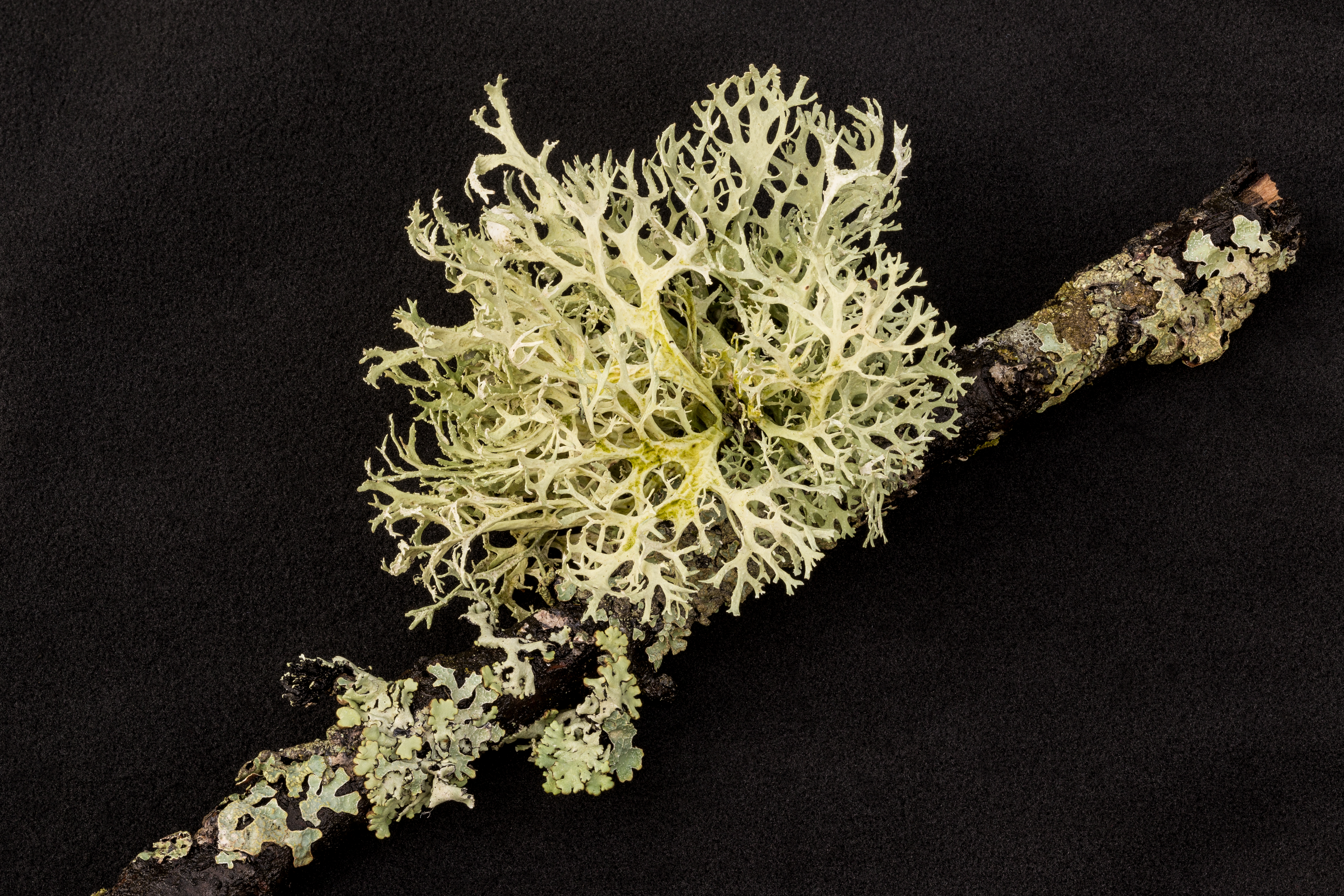
Lichens considered to be example of mutualistic symbiosis

Mutualism describes the ecological interaction between two or more species where each species has a net benefit. Mutualism is a common type of ecological interaction. Some prominent examples are:

- the nutrient exchange between vascular plants and mycorrhizal fungi,
- the fertilization of flowering plants by pollinators,
- the ways plants use fruits and edible seeds to encourage animal aid in seed dispersal, and
- the way corals become photosynthetic with the help of the microorganism zooxanthellae.

Mutualism can be contrasted with interspecific competition, in which each species experiences reduced fitness, and exploitation, and with parasitism, in which one species benefits at the expense of the other. However, mutualism may evolve from interactions that began with imbalanced benefits, such as parasitism.

The term mutualism was introduced by Pierre-Joseph van Beneden in his 1876 book Animal Parasites and Messmates to mean "mutual aid among species".

Mutualism is often conflated with two other types of ecological phenomena: cooperation and symbiosis. Cooperation most commonly refers to increases in fitness through within-species (intraspecific) interactions, although it has been used (especially in the past) to refer to mutualistic interactions, and it is sometimes used to refer to mutualistic interactions that are not obligate. Symbiosis involves two species living in close physical contact over a long period of their existence and may be mutualistic, parasitic, or commensal, so symbiotic relationships are not always mutualistic, and mutualistic interactions are not always symbiotic. Despite a different definition between mutualism and symbiosis, they have been largely used interchangeably in the past, and confusion on their use has persisted.

Mutualism plays a key part in ecology and evolution. For example, mutualistic interactions are vital for terrestrial ecosystem function as:

- about 80% of land plants species rely on mycorrhizal relationships with fungi to provide them with inorganic compounds and trace elements.
- estimates of tropical rainforest plants with seed dispersal mutualisms with animals range at least from 70% to 93.5%. In addition, mutualism is thought to have driven the evolution of much of the biological diversity we see, such as flower forms (important for pollination mutualisms) and co-evolution between groups of species.

A prominent example of pollination mutualism is with bees and flowering plants. Bees use these plants as their food source with pollen and nectar. In turn, they transfer pollen to other nearby flowers, inadvertently allowing for cross-pollination. Cross-pollination has become essential in plant reproduction and fruit/seed production. The bees get their nutrients from the plants, and allow for successful fertilization of plants, demonstrating a mutualistic relationship between two seemingly-unlike species.

Mutualism has also been linked to major evolutionary events, such as the evolution of the eukaryotic cell (symbiogenesis) and the colonization of land by plants in association with mycorrhizal fungi.

== Types ==
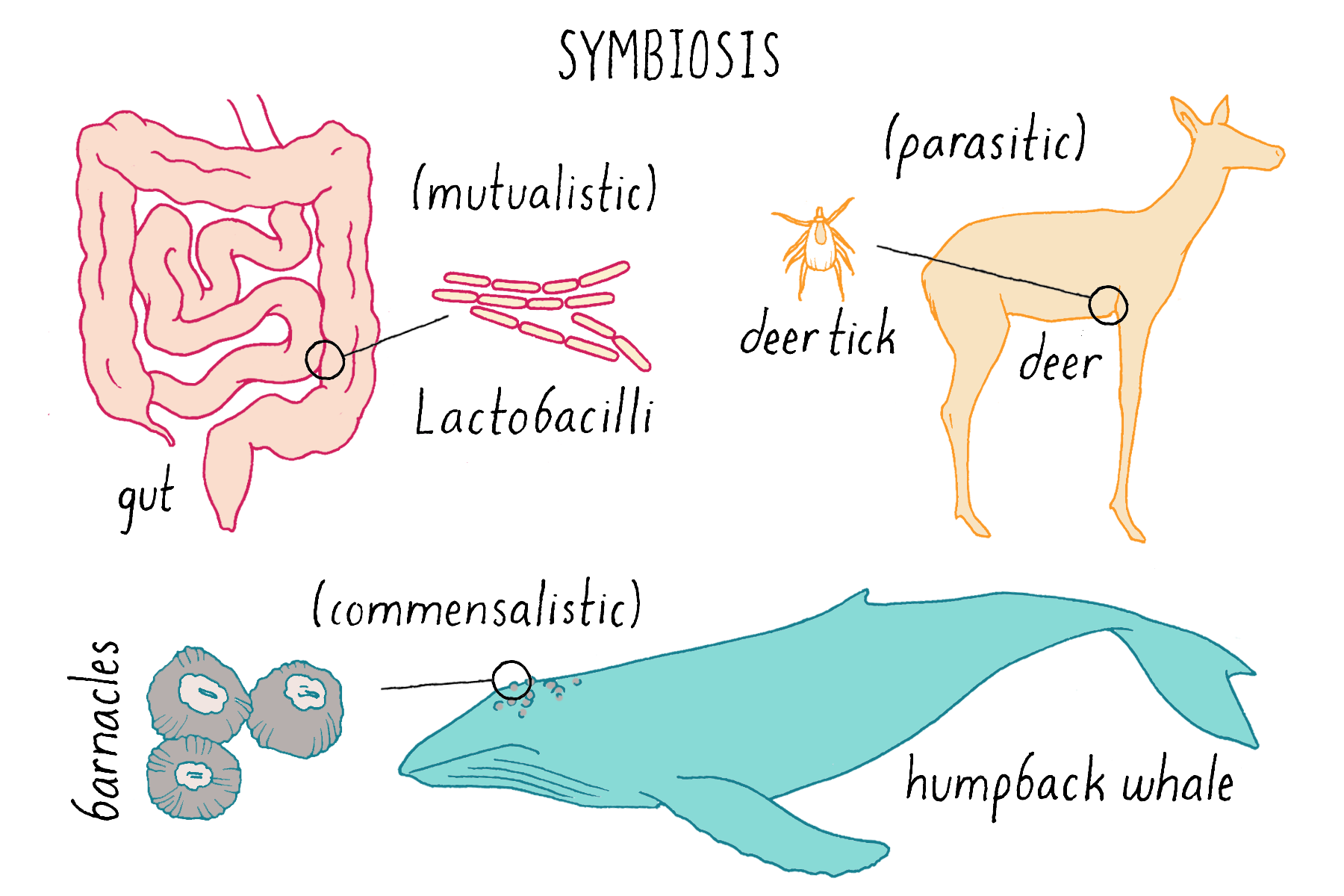
Mutualism is a form of symbiosis where each species has a net benefit, such as with lactobacilli in the human gut.

=== Resource-resource relationships ===
Mutualistic relationships can be thought of as a form of "biological barter" in mycorrhizal associations between plant roots and fungi, with the plant providing carbohydrates to the fungus in return for primarily phosphate but also nitrogenous compounds. Other examples include rhizobia bacteria that fix nitrogen for leguminous plants (family Fabaceae) in return for energy-containing carbohydrates. Metabolite exchange between multiple mutualistic species of bacteria has also been observed in a process known as cross-feeding.

=== Service-resource relationships ===
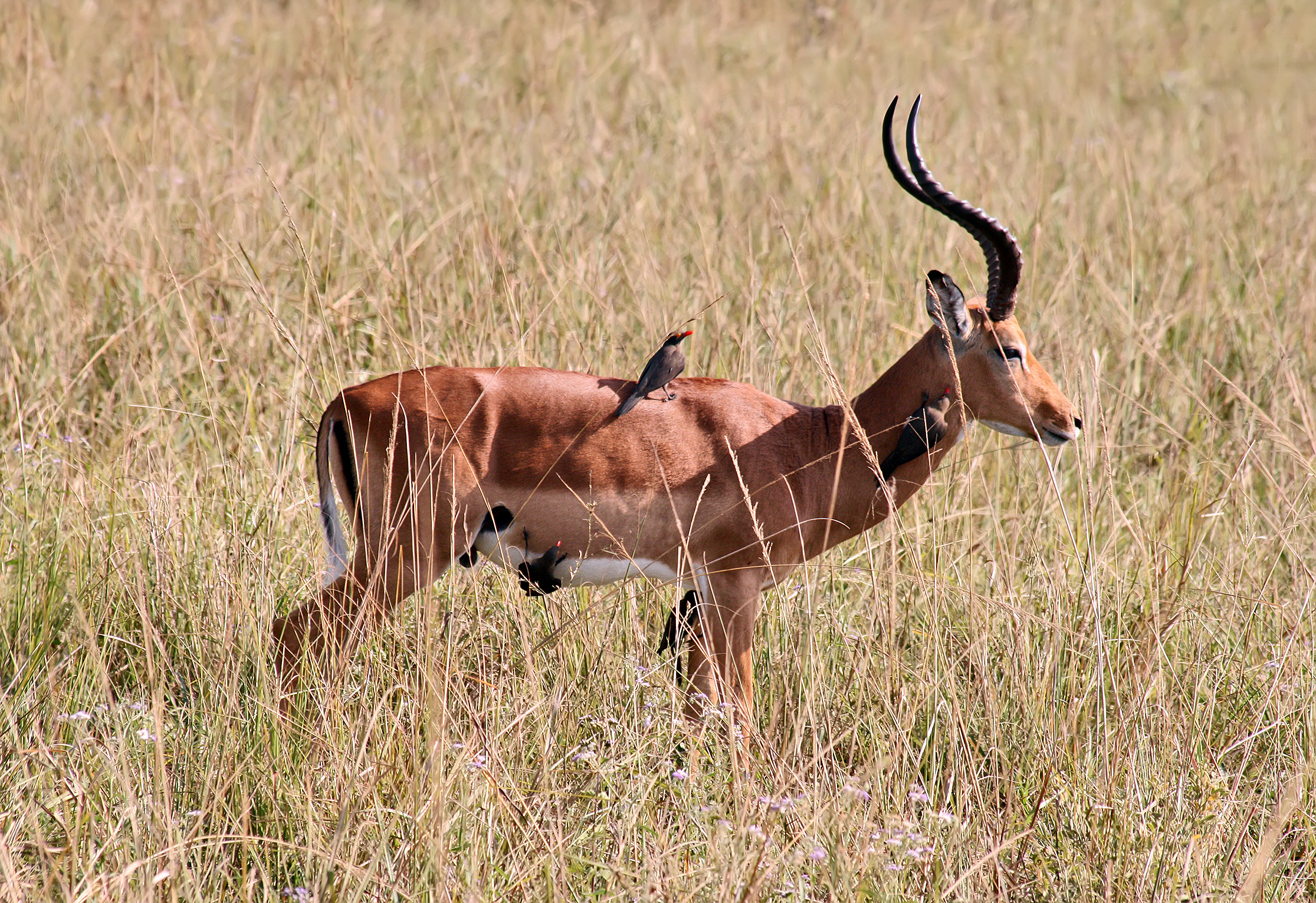
The red-billed oxpecker eats ticks on the impala's coat, in a cleaning symbiosis.

Service-resource relationships are common. Three important types are pollination, cleaning symbiosis, and zoochory.

In pollination, a plant trades food resources in the form of nectar or pollen for the service of pollen dispersal. However, daciniphilous Bulbophyllum orchid species trade sex pheromone precursor or booster components via floral synomones/attractants in a true mutualistic interactions with males of Dacini fruit flies (Diptera: Tephritidae: Dacinae).

Phagophiles feed (resource) on ectoparasites, thereby providing anti-pest service, as in cleaning symbiosis. Elacatinus and Gobiosoma, genera of gobies, feed on ectoparasites of their clients while cleaning them.

Zoochory is the dispersal of the seeds of plants by animals. This is similar to pollination in that the plant produces food resources (for example, fleshy fruit, overabundance of seeds) for animals that disperse the seeds (service). Plants may advertise these resources using colour and a variety of other fruit characteristics, e.g., scent. Fruit of the aardvark cucumber (Cucumis humifructus) is buried so deeply that the plant is solely reliant upon the aardvark's keen sense of smell to detect its ripened fruit, extract, consume and then scatter its seeds; C. humifructus's geographical range is thus restricted to that of the aardvark.

Another type is ant protection of aphids, where the aphids trade sugar-rich honeydew (a by-product of their mode of feeding on plant sap) in return for defense against predators such as ladybugs.

=== Service-service relationships ===
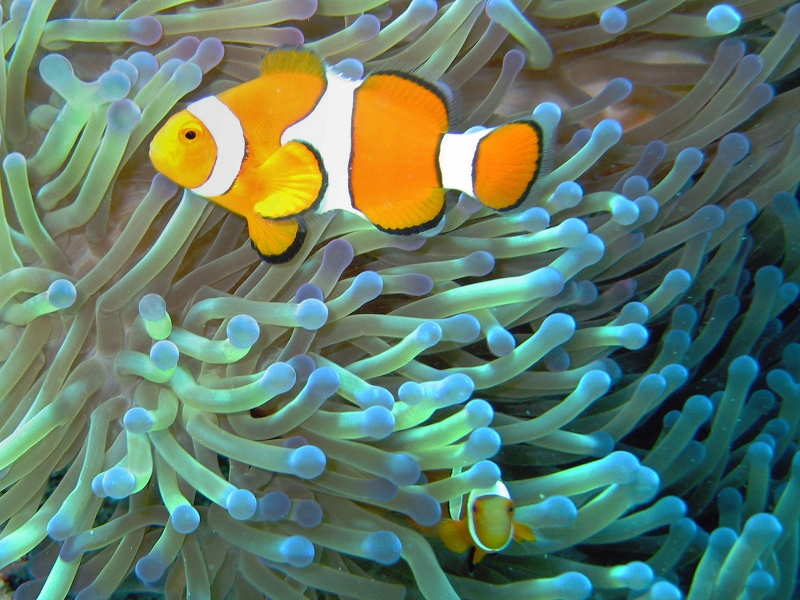
Ocellaris clownfish and Ritter's sea anemones live in a mutual service-service symbiosis, the fish driving off butterflyfish and the anemone's tentacles protecting the fish from predators.

Strict service-service interactions are very rare, for reasons that are far from clear. One example is the relationship between sea anemones and anemone fish in the family Pomacentridae: the anemones provide the fish with protection from predators (which cannot tolerate the stings of the anemone's tentacles) and the fish defend the anemones against butterflyfish (family Chaetodontidae), which eat anemones. However, in common with many mutualisms, there is more than one aspect to it: in the anemonefish-anemone mutualism, waste ammonia from the fish feeds the symbiotic algae that are found in the anemone's tentacles. Therefore, what appears to be a service-service mutualism in fact has a service-resource component. A second example is that of the relationship between some ants in the genus Pseudomyrmex and trees in the genus Acacia, such as the whistling thorn and bullhorn acacia. The ants nest inside the plant's thorns. In exchange for shelter, the ants protect acacias from attack by herbivores (which they frequently eat when those are small enough, introducing a resource component to this service-service relationship) and competition from other plants by trimming back vegetation that would shade the acacia. In addition, another service-resource component is present, as the ants regularly feed on lipid-rich food-bodies called Beltian bodies that are on the Acacia plant.

In the neotropics, the ant Myrmelachista schumanni makes its nest in special cavities in Duroia hirsuta. Plants in the vicinity that belong to other species are killed with formic acid. This selective gardening can be so aggressive that small areas of the rainforest are dominated by Duroia hirsute. These peculiar patches are known by local people as "devil's gardens".

In some of these relationships, the cost of the ant's protection can be quite expensive. Cordia sp. trees in the Amazon rainforest have a kind of partnership with Allomerus sp. ants, which make their nests in modified leaves. To increase the amount of living space available, the ants will destroy the tree's flower buds. The flowers die and leaves develop instead, providing the ants with more dwellings. Another type of Allomerus sp. ant lives with the Hirtella sp. tree in the same forests, but in this relationship, the tree has turned the tables on the ants. When the tree is ready to produce flowers, the ant abodes on certain branches begin to wither and shrink, forcing the occupants to flee, leaving the tree's flowers to develop free from ant attack.

The term "species group" can be used to describe the manner in which individual organisms group together. In this non-taxonomic context one can refer to "same-species groups" and "mixed-species groups." While same-species groups are the norm, examples of mixed-species groups abound. For example, zebra (Equus burchelli) and wildebeest (Connochaetes taurinus) can remain in association during periods of long distance migration across the Serengeti as a strategy for thwarting predators. Cercopithecus mitis and Cercopithecus ascanius, species of monkey in the Kakamega Forest of Kenya, can stay in close proximity and travel along exactly the same routes through the forest for periods of up to 12 hours. These mixed-species groups cannot be explained by the coincidence of sharing the same habitat. Rather, they are created by the active behavioural choice of at least one of the species in question.

=== Protocooperation ===
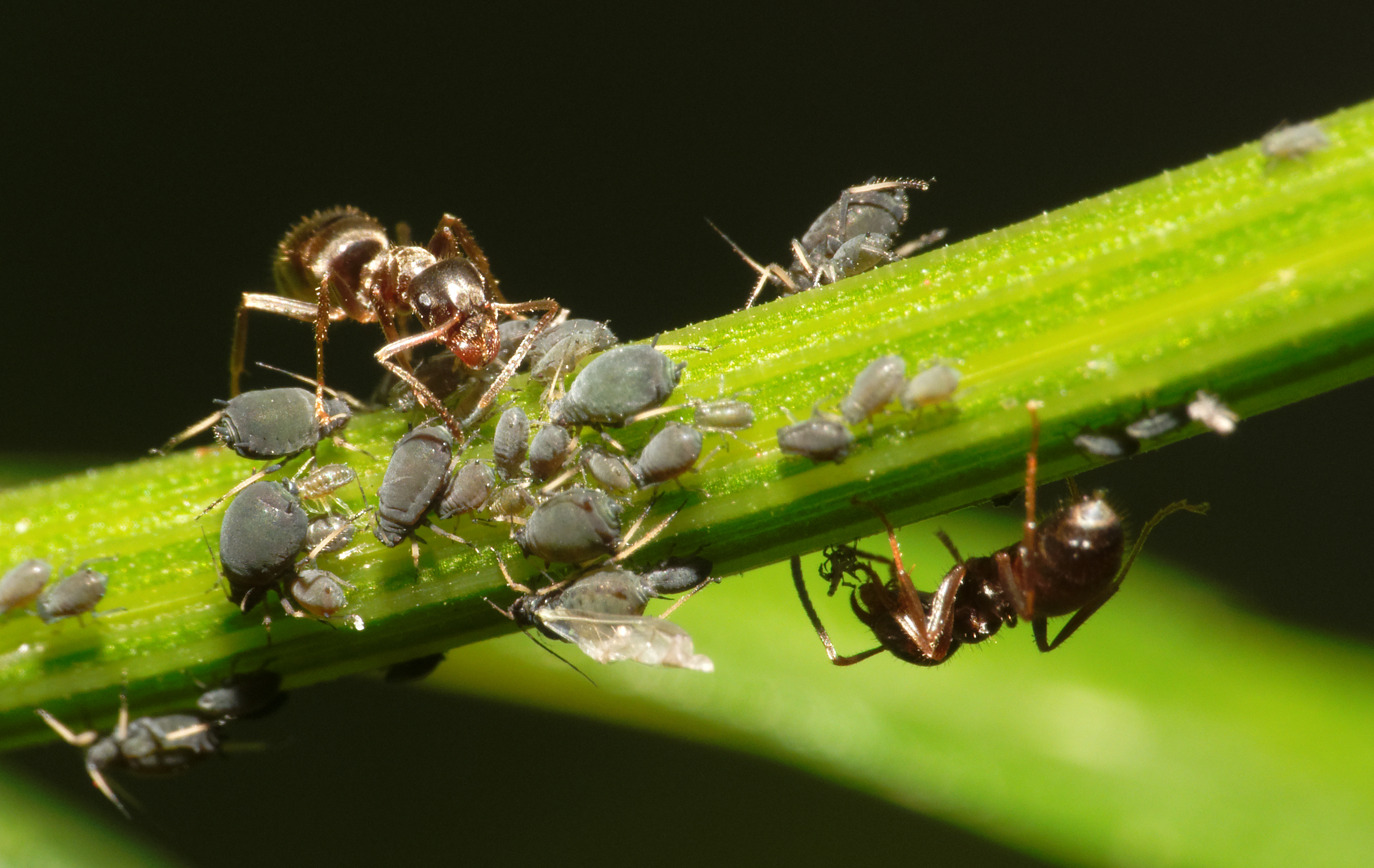
Ants and aphids

Protocooperation is a form of mutualism, but the cooperating species do not depend on each other for survival. The term, initially used for intraspecific interactions, was popularized by Eugene Odum (1953), although it is now rarely used.

== Evolution ==
Mutualistic symbiosis can sometimes evolve from parasitism or commensalism. Symbiogenesis, a leading theory on the evolution of Eukaryotes states the origin of the mitochondria and cell nucleus emerged from a parasitic relationship of ancient Archaea and Bacteria. Fungi's relationship to plants in the form of mycelium evolved from parasitism and commensalism. Under certain conditions species of fungi previously in a state of mutualism can turn parasitic on weak or dying plants. Likewise the symbiotic relationship of clown fish and sea anemones emerged from a commensalist relationship. Once a mutualistic relationship emerges both symbionts are pushed towards co-evolution with each other.

== Mathematical modeling ==
Mathematical treatments of mutualisms, like the study of mutualisms in general, have lagged behind those for predation, or predator-prey, consumer-resource, interactions. In models of mutualisms, the terms "type I" and "type II" functional responses refer to the linear and saturating relationships, respectively, between the benefit provided to an individual of species 1 (dependent variable) and the density of species 2 (independent variable).

=== Type I functional response ===
One of the simplest frameworks for modeling species interactions is the Lotka–Volterra equations. In this model, the changes in population densities of the two mutualists are quantified as:

$$\begin{align}
\frac{dN_1}{dt} &=r_1 N_1 - \alpha_{11} N_1^2 + \beta _{12}N_1N_2 \\[8pt]
\frac{dN_2}{dt} &=r_2 N_2 - \alpha_{22} N_2^2 + \beta _{21}N_1N_2
\end{align}$$

where

- $N_i$ = the population density of species i.
- $r_i$ = the intrinsic growth rate of the population of species i.
- $\alpha _{ii}$ = the negative effect of within-species crowding on species i.
- $\beta _{ij}$ = the beneficial effect of the density of species j on species i.

Mutualism is in essence the logistic growth equation modified for mutualistic interaction. The mutualistic interaction term represents the increase in population growth of one species as a result of the presence of greater numbers of another species. As the mutualistic interactive term β is always positive, this simple model may lead to unrealistic unbounded growth. So it may be more realistic to include a further term in the formula, representing a saturation mechanism, to avoid this occurring.

=== Type II functional response ===
In 1989, David Hamilton Wright modified the above Lotka–Volterra equations by adding a new term, βM/K, to represent a mutualistic relationship. Wright also considered the concept of saturation, which means that with higher densities, there is a decrease in the benefits of further increases of the mutualist population. Without saturation, depending on the size of parameter α, species densities would increase indefinitely. Because that is not possible due to environmental constraints and carrying capacity, a model that includes saturation would be more accurate. Wright's mathematical theory is based on the premise of a simple two-species mutualism model in which the benefits of mutualism become saturated due to limits posed by handling time. Wright defines handling time as the time needed to process a food item, from the initial interaction to the start of a search for new food items and assumes that processing of food and searching for food are mutually exclusive. Mutualists that display foraging behavior are exposed to the restrictions on handling time. Mutualism can be associated with symbiosis.

Handling time interactions

In 1959, C. S. Holling performed his classic disc experiment that assumed that

1. the number of food items captured is proportional to the allotted searching time; and
2. that there is a handling time variable that exists separately from the notion of search time. He then developed an equation for the Type II functional response, which showed that the feeding rate is equivalent to

$$\cfrac{ax}{1+axT_H}$$

where

- a = the instantaneous discovery rate
- x = food item density
- T_{H} = handling time

The equation that incorporates Type II functional response and mutualism is:

$$\frac{dN}{dt}=N\left[r(1-cN)+\cfrac{baM}{1+aT_H M}\right]$$

where

- N and M = densities of the two mutualists
- r = intrinsic rate of increase of N
- c = coefficient measuring negative intraspecific interaction. This is equivalent to inverse of the carrying capacity, 1/K, of N, in the logistic equation.
- a = instantaneous discovery rate
- b = coefficient converting encounters with M to new units of N

or, equivalently,

$$\frac{dN}{dt}=N[r(1-cN)+\beta M/(X+M)]$$

where

- X = 1/aT_{H}
- β = b/T_{H}

This model is most effectively applied to free-living species that encounter a number of individuals of the mutualist part in the course of their existences. Wright notes that models of biological mutualism tend to be similar qualitatively, in that the featured isoclines generally have a positive decreasing slope, and by and large similar isocline diagrams. Mutualistic interactions are best visualized as positively sloped isoclines, which can be explained by the fact that the saturation of benefits accorded to mutualism or restrictions posed by outside factors contribute to a decreasing slope.

The type II functional response is visualized as the graph of $\cfrac{baM}{1+aT_H M}$ vs. M.

== Structure of networks ==
Mutualistic networks made up out of the interaction between plants and pollinators were found to have a similar structure in very different ecosystems on different continents, consisting of entirely different species. The structure of these mutualistic networks may have large consequences for the way in which pollinator communities respond to increasingly harsh conditions and on the community carrying capacity.

Mathematical models that examine the consequences of this network structure for the stability of pollinator communities suggest that the specific way in which plant-pollinator networks are organized minimizes competition between pollinators, reduce the spread of indirect effects and thus enhance ecosystem stability and may even lead to strong indirect facilitation between pollinators when conditions are harsh. This means that pollinator species together can survive under harsh conditions. But it also means that pollinator species collapse simultaneously when conditions pass a critical point. This simultaneous collapse occurs, because pollinator species depend on each other when surviving under difficult conditions.

Such a community-wide collapse, involving many pollinator species, can occur suddenly when increasingly harsh conditions pass a critical point and recovery from such a collapse might not be easy. The improvement in conditions needed for pollinators to recover could be substantially larger than the improvement needed to return to conditions at which the pollinator community collapsed.

== Humans ==
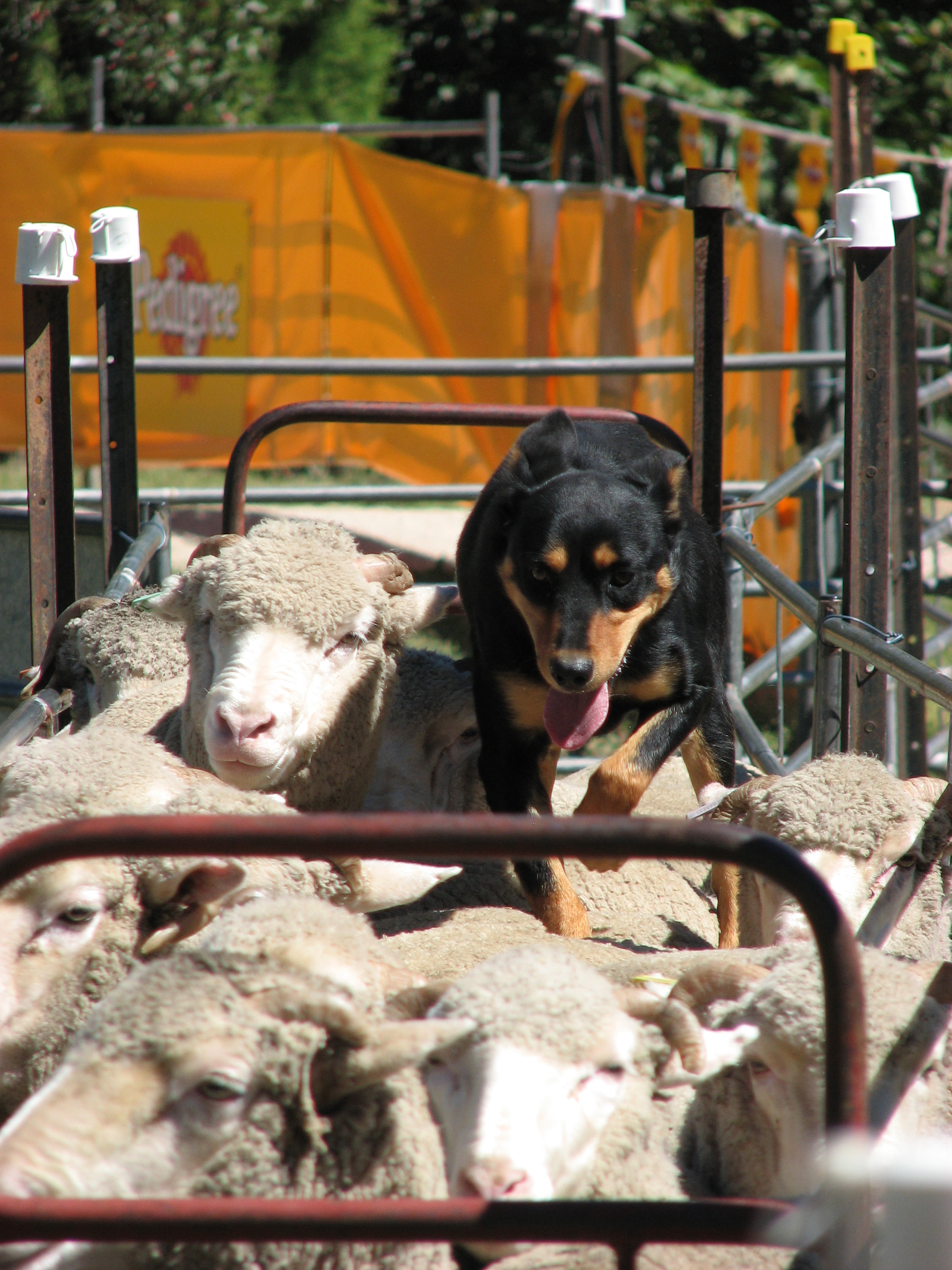
Dogs and sheep were among the first animals to be domesticated.

Humans are involved in mutualisms with other species: their gut flora is essential for efficient digestion. Infestations of head lice might have been beneficial for humans by fostering an immune response that helps to reduce the threat of body louse borne lethal diseases.

Some relationships between humans and domesticated animals and plants are to different degrees mutualistic. For example, domesticated cereals that provide food for humans have lost the ability to spread seeds by shattering, a strategy that wild grains use to spread their seeds.

In traditional agriculture, some plants have mutualistic relationships as companion plants, providing each other with shelter, soil fertility or natural pest control. For example, beans may grow up cornstalks as a trellis, while fixing nitrogen in the soil for the corn, a phenomenon that is used in Three Sisters farming.

One researcher has proposed that the key advantage Homo sapiens had over Neanderthals in competing over similar habitats was the former's mutualism with dogs.

=== Intestinal microbiota ===
The microbiota in the human intestine coevolved with the human species, and this relationship is considered to be a mutualism that is beneficial both to the human host and the bacteria in the gut population. The mucous layer of the intestine contains commensal bacteria that produce bacteriocins, modify the pH of the intestinal contents, and compete for nutrition to inhibit colonization by pathogens. The gut microbiota, containing trillions of microorganisms, possesses the metabolic capacity to produce and regulate multiple compounds that reach the circulation and act to influence the function of distal organs and systems. Breakdown of the protective mucosal barrier of the gut can contribute to the development of colon cancer.

== Evolution of mutualism ==
=== Evolution by type ===
Every generation of every organism needs nutrients – and similar nutrients – more than they need particular defensive characteristics, as the fitness benefit of these vary heavily especially by environment. This may be the reason that hosts are more likely to evolve to become dependent on vertically transmitted bacterial mutualists which provide nutrients than those providing defensive benefits. This pattern is generalized beyond bacteria by Yamada et al. 2015's demonstration that undernourished Drosophila are heavily dependent on their fungal symbiont Issatchenkia orientalis for amino acids.

=== Mutualism breakdown ===
Mutualisms are not static, and can be lost by evolution. Sachs and Simms (2006) suggest that this can occur via four main pathways:

1. One mutualist shifts to parasitism, and no longer benefits its partner, such as headlice
2. One partner abandons the mutualism and lives autonomously
3. One partner may go extinct
4. A partner may be switched to another species

There are many examples of mutualism breakdown. For example, plant lineages inhabiting nutrient-rich environments have evolutionarily abandoned mycorrhizal mutualisms many times independently. Evolutionarily, headlice may have been mutualistic as they allow for early immunity to various body-louse borne disease; however, as these diseases became eradicated, the relationship has become less mutualistic and more parasitic.

== Measuring and defining mutualism ==
Measuring the exact fitness benefit to the individuals in a mutualistic relationship is not always straightforward, particularly when the individuals can receive benefits from a variety of species, for example most plant-pollinator mutualisms. It is therefore common to categorise mutualisms according to the closeness of the association, using terms such as obligate and facultative. Defining "closeness", however, is also problematic. It can refer to mutual dependency (the species cannot live without one another) or the biological intimacy of the relationship in relation to physical closeness (e.g., one species living within the tissues of the other species).

== See also ==
- Arbuscular mycorrhiza
- Co-adaptation
- Coevolution
- Ecological facilitation
- Frugivore
- Greater honeyguide – has a mutualism with humans
- Interspecies communication
- Müllerian mimicry
- Mutualisms and conservation
- Mutual Aid: A Factor of Evolution
- Symbiogenesis
- Plant–animal interaction

== Further references ==
- Angier, Natalie (22 July 2016). "African Tribesmen Can Talk Birds into Helping Them Find Honey". The New York Times.
- Bascompte, J.; Jordano, P.; Melián, C. J.; Olesen, J. M. (2003). "The nested assembly of plant–animal mutualistic networks". Proceedings of the National Academy of Sciences. 100 (16): 9383–7. Bibcode:2003PNAS..100.9383B. doi:10.1073/pnas.1633576100. PMC 170927. PMID 12881488.
- Bastolla, U.; Fortuna, M. A.; Pascual-García, A.; Ferrera, A.; Luque, B.; Bascompte, J. (2009). "The architecture of mutualistic networks minimizes competition and increases biodiversity". Nature. 458 (7241): 1018–20. Bibcode:2009Natur.458.1018B. doi:10.1038/nature07950. PMID 19396144. S2CID 4395634.
- Breton, Lorraine M.; Addicott, John F. (1992). "Density-Dependent Mutualism in an Aphid-Ant Interaction". Ecology. 73 (6): 2175–80. Bibcode:1992Ecol...73.2175B. doi:10.2307/1941465. JSTOR 1941465.
- Bronstein, JL (1994). "Our current understanding of mutualism". Quarterly Review of Biology. 69 (1): 31–51. doi:10.1086/418432. S2CID 85294431.
- Bronstein, JL (2001). "The exploitation of mutualisms". Ecology Letters. 4 (3): 277–287. Bibcode:2001EcolL...4..277B. doi:10.1046/j.1461-0248.2001.00218.x.
- Bronstein JL. 2001. The costs of mutualism. American Zoologist 41 (4): 825–839 S
- Bronstein, JL; Alarcon, R; Geber, M (2006). "The evolution of plant-insect mutualisms". New Phytologist. 172 (3): 412–28. Bibcode:2006NewPh.172..412B. doi:10.1111/j.1469-8137.2006.01864.x. PMID 17083673.
- Denison, RF; Kiers, ET (2004). "Why are most rhizobia beneficial to their plant hosts, rather than parasitic?". Microbes and Infection. 6 (13): 1235–9. doi:10.1016/j.micinf.2004.08.005. PMID 15488744.
- DeVries, PJ; Baker, I (1989). "Butterfly exploitation of an ant-plant mutualism: Adding insult of herbivory". Journal of the New York Entomological Society. 97 (3): 332–340.
- Hoeksema, J.D.; Bruna, E.M. (2000). "Pursuing the big questions about interspecific mutualism: a review of theoretical approaches". Oecologia. 125 (3): 321–330. Bibcode:2000Oecol.125..321H. doi:10.1007/s004420000496. PMID 28547326. S2CID 22756212.
- Jahn, G.C.; Beardsley, J.W. (2000). "Interactions of ants (Hymenoptera: Formicidae) and mealybugs (Homoptera: Pseudococcidae) on pineapple". Proceedings of the Hawaiian Entomological Society. 34: 181–5. hdl:10125/8370.
- Jahn, Gary C.; Beardsley, J. W.; González-Hernández, H. (2003). "A review of the association of ants with mealybug wilt disease of pineapple" (PDF). Proceedings of the Hawaiian Entomological Society. 36: 9–28. hdl:10125/95.
- Lever, J. J.; Nes, E. H.; Scheffer, M.; Bascompte, J. (2014). "The sudden collapse of pollinator communities". Ecology Letters. 17 (3): 350–9. Bibcode:2014EcolL..17..350L. doi:10.1111/ele.12236. hdl:10261/91808. PMID 24386999.
- Noe, R.; Hammerstein, P. (1994). "Biological markets: supply and demand determine the effect of partner choice in cooperation, mutualism and mating". Behavioral Ecology and Sociobiology. 35 (1): 1–11. Bibcode:1994BEcoS..35....1N. doi:10.1007/bf00167053. S2CID 37085820.
- Ollerton, J. (2006). ""Biological Barter": Patterns of Specialization Compared across Different Mutualisms". In Waser, N.M.; Ollerton, J. (eds.). Plant-Pollinator Interactions: From Specialization to Generalization. University of Chicago Press. pp. 411–435. ISBN 978-0-226-87400-5. OCLC 1109234356.
- Paszkowski, U (2006). "Mutualism and parasitism: the yin and yang of plant symbioses". Current Opinion in Plant Biology. 9 (4): 364–370. Bibcode:2006COPB....9..364P. doi:10.1016/j.pbi.2006.05.008. PMID 16713732.
- Porat, D.; Chadwick-Furman, N. E. (2004). "Effects of anemonefish on giant sea anemones:expansion behavior, growth, and survival". Hydrobiologia. 530 (1–3): 513–520. Bibcode:2004HyBio.530..513P. doi:10.1007/s10750-004-2688-y. S2CID 2251533.
- Porat, D.; Chadwick-Furman, N. E. (2005). "Effects of anemonefish on giant sea anemones: ammonium uptake, zooxanthella content and tissue regeneration". Mar. Freshw. Behav. Phys. 38 (1): 43–51. Bibcode:2005MFBP...38...43P. doi:10.1080/10236240500057929. S2CID 53051081.
- Thompson, J. N. 2005. The Geographic Mosaic of Coevolution. University of Chicago Press. ISBN 978-0-226-79762-5
- Wright, David Hamilton (1989). "A Simple, Stable Model of Mutualism Incorporating Handling Time". The American Naturalist. 134 (4): 664–7. Bibcode:1989ANat..134..664W. doi:10.1086/285003. S2CID 83502337.
