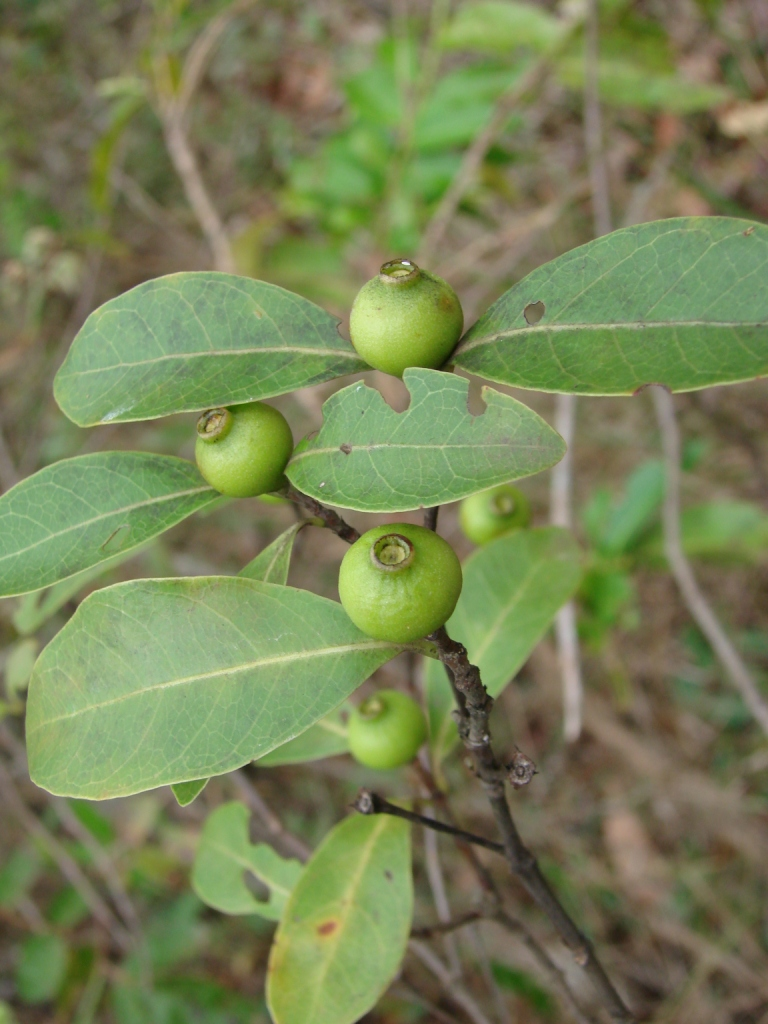
- Cordiera sessilis

Scientific classification
- Kingdom: Plantae
- Clade: Tracheophytes
- Clade: Angiosperms
- Clade: Eudicots
- Clade: Asterids
- Order: Gentianales
- Family: Rubiaceae
- Subfamily: Ixoroideae
- Tribe: Cordiereae
- Genus: Cordiera; A.Rich. ex DC.

Type species
- Cordiera triflora A.Rich. ex DC.

= Cordiera =

Genus of plants

Cordiera is a genus of flowering plants in the family Rubiaceae. The genus is found in central and southern tropical America.

== Species ==
- Cordiera concolor (Cham.) Kuntze
  - Cordiera concolor var. concolor
  - Cordiera concolor var. goyana C.H.Perss. & Delprete
- Cordiera elliptica (Cham.) Kuntze
- Cordiera garapatica (K.Schum.) Kuntze
- Cordiera hadrantha (Standl.) C.H.Perss. & Delprete
- Cordiera humilis (K.Schum.) Kuntze
  - Cordiera humilis var. amplexicaulis (S.Moore) C.H.Perss.
  - Cordiera humilis var. humilis
- Cordiera longicaudata C.H.Perss. & Delprete
- Cordiera macrophylla (K.Schum.) Kuntze
- Cordiera myrciifolia (K.Schum.) C.H.Perss. & Delprete
- Cordiera rigida (K.Schum.) Kuntze
- Cordiera sessilis (Vell.) Kuntze
- Cordiera triflora A.Rich. ex DC.
