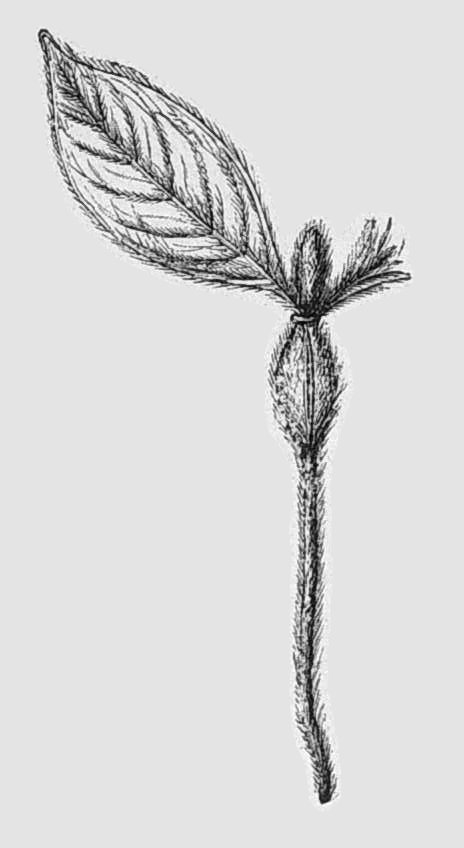

Scientific classification
- Kingdom: Plantae
- Clade: Tracheophytes
- Clade: Angiosperms
- Clade: Eudicots
- Clade: Asterids
- Order: Gentianales
- Family: Rubiaceae
- Genus: Duroia
- Species: D. hirsuta

Binomial name
- Duroia hirsuta K.Schum.

= Duroia hirsuta =

Species of flowering plant

Duroia hirsuta is a myrmecophyte tree species from the Amazon Forest. It is one of some 37 species of Duroia, which are shrubs or canopy trees in the family Rubiaceae, favoring ants (myrmecophilous), and occurring in Central America as far north as Mexico, the Amazon Basin, the Guiana Shield, the Brazilian Atlantic coast and planalto.

== Plant Interactions ==
A number of Duroia species and possibly all are capable of biochemical interactions inhibiting the growth of neighbouring plants. Analysis of root extracts from Duroia hirsuta have yielded a strong plant growth inhibitor plumericin, a tetracyclic iridoid lactone, and duroin, another iridoid lactone.

This process, common amongst plants, is termed allelopathy. In the case of Duroia hirsuta, the chemical inhibitor is aided by the Lemon Ant, a resident on and in the tree, and playing an active role in suppressing and destroying plant growth in the vicinity of their host by injecting and spraying formic acid, and defending against herbivores - other ant species such as Azteca spp. and Allomerus octoarticulatus demerarae exhibit the same mutualism. The area around this understory tree is often devoid of all other plant types, leading to the local name "Devil's garden." The cost to the host plant for this protection is considerable, since the resident ants subject the tree to increased leaf cutting. Trees that grow outside the cleared area often have the living tissues of their trunks excavated and galled for ant accommodation.

The ants involved in the relationship specifically aid the plant in defense against herbivores, supplying nutrients, and pollination. Their mutualism is strengthened by the positive size-dependent growth each gains from the relationship. One specific type of ant, the M. Schummanni are notorious for supporting the largest plant sizes and growth rates.

== Environment Conditions ==
The environmental conditions that influence the fitness of the species also has an impact on the amount of rewards reaped by the ants involved in the mutualistic relationship with the plant. The effectiveness of ants is greater in conditions where nutrients are scarce as opposed to environments with favorable conditions for the plant. Size of the plant is a great indicator of fitness and is often measured by the amount of Domatia present. Ants can aid the plant in receiving more sunlight by clearing the canopies above the plant and limit competition from other nearby plants.
