= Shots & Squats =

Single by Vigiland featuring Tham Sway
- Released: 8 June 2015
- Genre: Melbourne bounce
- Length: 2:53
- Label: UNI
- Songwriters: Simon Strömstedt; Claes Remmered Persson; Otto Pettersson; David Landolf Noel Svahn
- Producer: Vigiland

Vigiland singles chronology
"Okay" (2014)	"Shots & Squats" (2015)	"Addicted" (2015)

"Shots & Squats" is a song by Swedish DJ/music producing house music duo Vigiland featuring Tham Sway. It was released as a single on 8 June 2015. It peaked at number 2 in Sweden, number 3 in Finland and number 7 in Denmark.

== Charts ==
=== Weekly charts ===
Chart (2015)	Peak; position
Denmark (Tracklisten)	7
Finland (Suomen virallinen lista)	3
Hungary (Stream Top 40)	34
Netherlands (Single Top 100)	94
Norway (VG-lista)	13
Sweden (Sverigetopplistan)	2

=== Year-end charts ===
Chart (2015)	Position
Sweden (Sverigetopplistan)	23

== Certifications ==
Region	Certification	Certified units/sales
Denmark (IFPI Danmark)	Platinum	60,000^{^}
Germany (BVMI)	Gold	200,000^{‡}
Italy (FIMI)	Gold	25,000^{‡}
Sweden (GLF)	5× Platinum	200,000^{‡}
^{^} Shipments figures based on certification alone.^{‡} Sales+streaming figures based on certification alone.
