= Retiniphyllum cataractae =

Scientific classification
- Kingdom: Plantae
- Clade: Tracheophytes
- Clade: Angiosperms
- Clade: Eudicots
- Clade: Asterids
- Order: Gentianales
- Family: Rubiaceae
- Genus: Retiniphyllum
- Species: R. cataractae

Binomial name
- Retiniphyllum cataractae Ducke

Species of plant

Retiniphyllum cataractae is a species of flowering plant in the family Rubiaceae. It is endemic to the Amazonas. It was described for the first time by Adolpho Ducke in 1938.
