= Retiniphyllum concolor =

Scientific classification
- Kingdom: Plantae
- Clade: Tracheophytes
- Clade: Angiosperms
- Clade: Eudicots
- Clade: Asterids
- Order: Gentianales
- Family: Rubiaceae
- Genus: Retiniphyllum
- Species: R. concolor

Binomial name
- Retiniphyllum concolor (Spruce ex Benth.) Müll.Arg.

Species of plant

Retiniphyllum concolor is a species of flowering plant in the family Rubiaceae.

It occurs from Colombia to Guyana and northern Brazil.
