= Riodocea =

Scientific classification
- Kingdom: Plantae
- Clade: Tracheophytes
- Clade: Angiosperms
- Clade: Eudicots
- Clade: Asterids
- Order: Gentianales
- Family: Rubiaceae
- Subfamily: Ixoroideae
- Tribe: Cordiereae
- Genus: Riodocea; Delprete
- Species: R. pulcherrima

Binomial name
- Riodocea pulcherrima Delprete

Genus of plants

Riodocea is a genus of plants in the family Rubiaceae. It includes only one known species, Riodocea pulcherrima, indigenous to the Espírito Santo region of Brazil.
