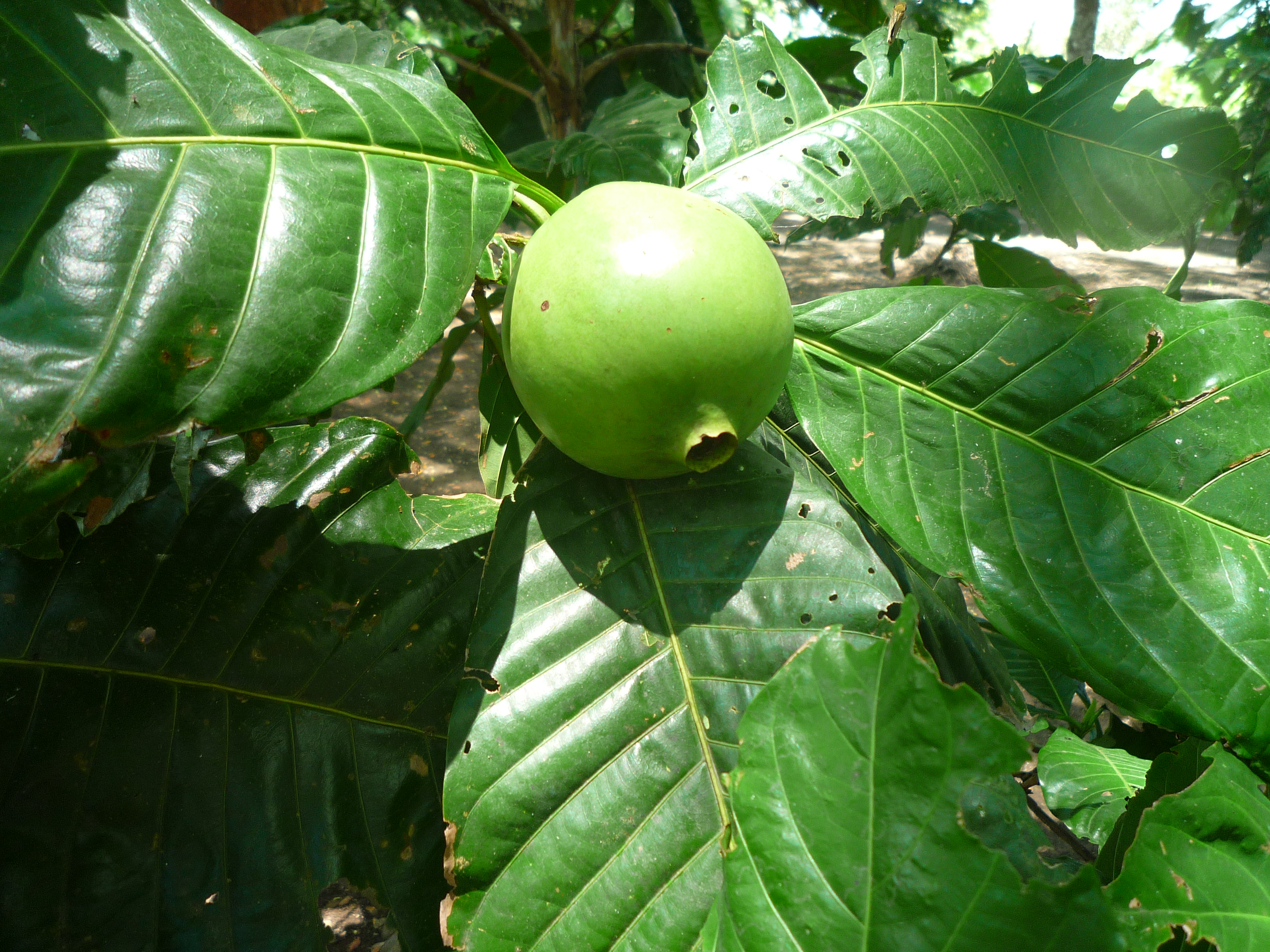

Scientific classification
- Kingdom: Plantae
- Clade: Embryophytes
- Clade: Tracheophytes
- Clade: Spermatophytes
- Clade: Angiosperms
- Clade: Eudicots
- Clade: Asterids
- Order: Gentianales
- Family: Rubiaceae
- Genus: Alibertia
- Species: A. patinoi

Binomial name
- Alibertia patinoi (Cuatrec.) Delprete

Synonyms
- Borojoa patinoi Cuatrec.

= Alibertia patinoi =

Borojó

Species of flowering plant

Alibertia patinoi, commonly known as borojó, is a small (2-5m), dioecious tropical rainforest tree, one of the few edible fruit bearing species in the Rubiaceae family. Borojó, native to the world's wettest lowlands (the Chocó–Darién moist forests ecoregion), grows in the Chocó Department of northwestern Colombia and in the Esmeraldas Province of northwestern Ecuador.

Borojó is an Emberá word meaning: boro = head, jo = fruit - head-shaped fruit, or round, globulous fruit. The species has also been reported from Panama, Venezuela and Costa Rica.

== Growth ==
Alibertia patinoi has grey-brown bark and sometimes has two or three smaller trunks as well as one main one. It needs high humidity (over 85%) and temperature (an average of at least 25 °C) to thrive, though it can tolerate brief frosts as well as floods.

== Fruit ==
The fruit is large (about 12 cm in length), with a round shape and brown color and average weight of 740-1000 grams. The pulp represents 88% of the total weight. Each fruit has 90 to 640 seeds. Borojo has high levels of protein, ascorbic acid, calcium and iron and very high levels of phosphorus. Borojo is used in the preparation of jam, wine, desserts and traditional medicines with supposed aphrodisiac effects. It is also used by the local communities against hypertension, bronchial diseases and malnutrition. Borojo extract is widely sold on the internet as a health food.

A study commissioned at Rutgers University by Nutropical, a private company, found that borojo fruit powder had a high and significant content of polyphenols as measured by the Folin-Ciocalteu polyphenol test. Most notably, the researchers believe the key polyphenol found in borojo may be novel. Work continues to identify the compound and/or elucidate its chemical structure. An analysis conducted by the same company found borojo has an ORAC value of over 54 μmolTE/g (5400 μmolTE/100g). The form of the fruit tested, however, is not mentioned (fresh, freeze-dried, spray-dried, etc.). The purported aphrodisiac properties of the fruit have a molecular basis.

== Cultivation ==
Around 3,000 hectares are used to cultivate borojo.

== Related species ==
Alibertia sorbilis is a very similar species, also used with commercial purposes. Borojó de la Amazonia (Amazonas borojo), Duroia maguirei, is a wild species in a different Rubiaceae genus, which grows up to 8 m and has a smaller, edible fruit. Claes Persson (1999)
