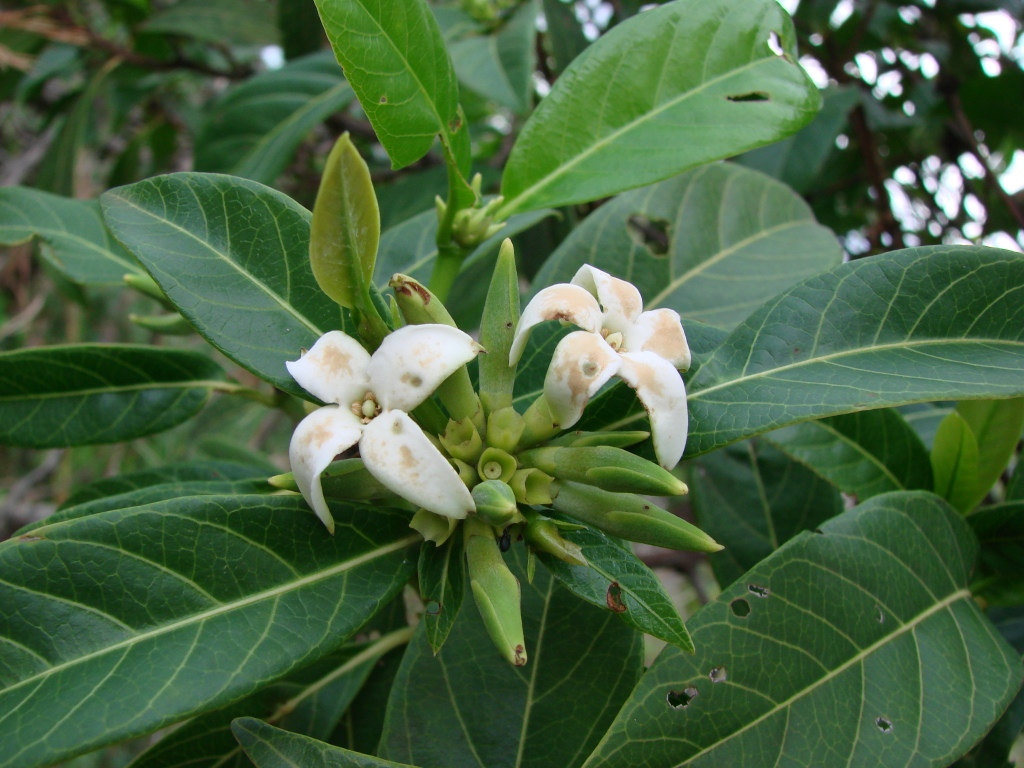
- Alibertia edulis leaves and flowers

Scientific classification
- Kingdom: Plantae
- Clade: Tracheophytes
- Clade: Angiosperms
- Clade: Eudicots
- Clade: Asterids
- Order: Gentianales
- Family: Rubiaceae
- Genus: Alibertia
- Species: A. edulis

Binomial name
- Alibertia edulis (Rich.) A.Rich. ex DC.

= Alibertia edulis =

Species of tree

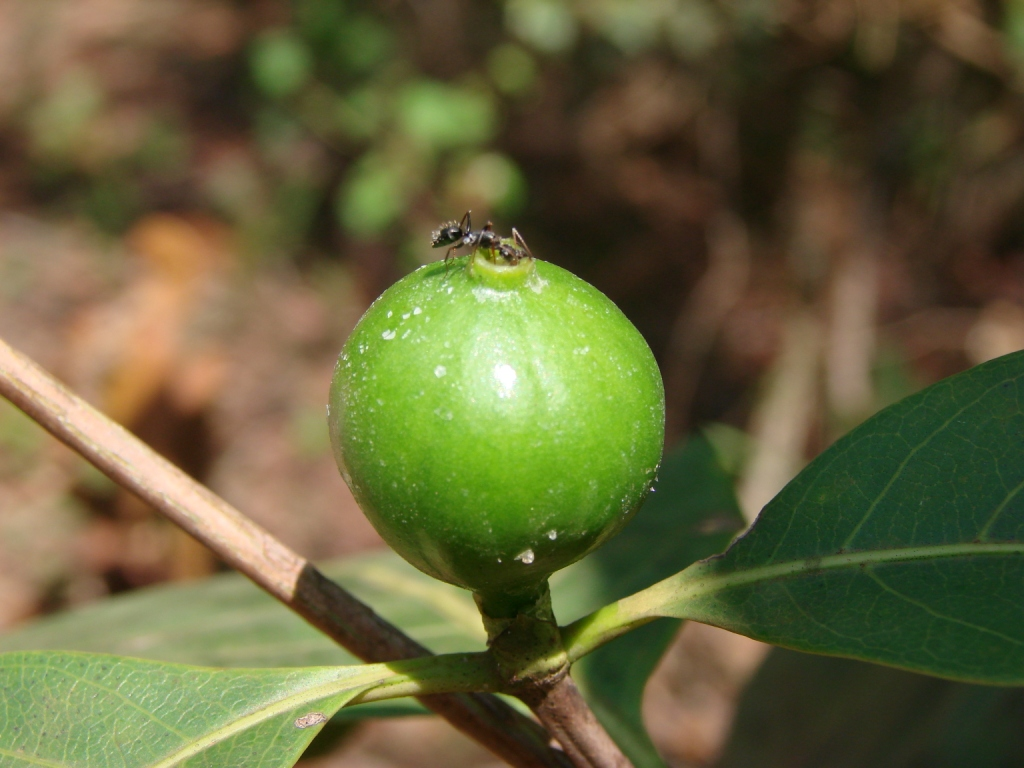
The unripe fruit of Alibertia edulis

Alibertia edulis is a species of tree in the family Rubiaceae. It is native to the tropical forests of the Americas.

== Description ==
Alibertia edulis is an evergreen dioecious tree up to 25 feet (7.5m) tall at maturity, with light brownish bark and opposite, ovate, dark green leaves that have a smooth margin. The flowers are tubular to trumpet-shaped, white, hairy, in 4-8" panicles, with 4-5 petals. The fruit is yellow, egg-shaped, ovate, edible, and made into jam or juices. The fruits are collected from trees in the wild, as this species is seldom cultivated.
