= UFO (Vigiland song) =

Single by Vigiland
- Released: 10 November 2014
- Genre: Melbourne bounce
- Length: 2:22
- Label: Universal
- Songwriters: Claes Remmered Persson; Otto Pettersson Noel Svahn
- Producers: Claes Remmered Persson; Otto Pettersson

Vigiland singles chronology
"UFO" (2014)	"Okay" (2014)

"UFO" is the debut single by Swedish DJ/music producing house music duo Vigiland, made up of Claes Remmered Persson and Otto Pettersson.

== Charts ==
=== Weekly charts ===
Chart (2014)	Peak; position
Denmark (Tracklisten)	11
Germany (GfK)	75
Norway (VG-lista)	10
Sweden (Sverigetopplistan)	2

=== Year-end charts ===
Chart (2014)	Position
Sweden (Sverigetopplistan)	84
Chart (2015)	Position
Sweden (Sverigetopplistan)	35

== Certifications ==
Region	Certification	Certified units/sales
Denmark (IFPI Danmark)	Platinum	60,000^{^}
Germany (BVMI)	Gold	200,000^{‡}
Sweden (GLF)	6× Platinum	240,000^{‡}
^{^} Shipments figures based on certification alone.^{‡} Sales+streaming figures based on certification alone.
