= Whorl (botany) =

Arrangement of plant parts around the stem

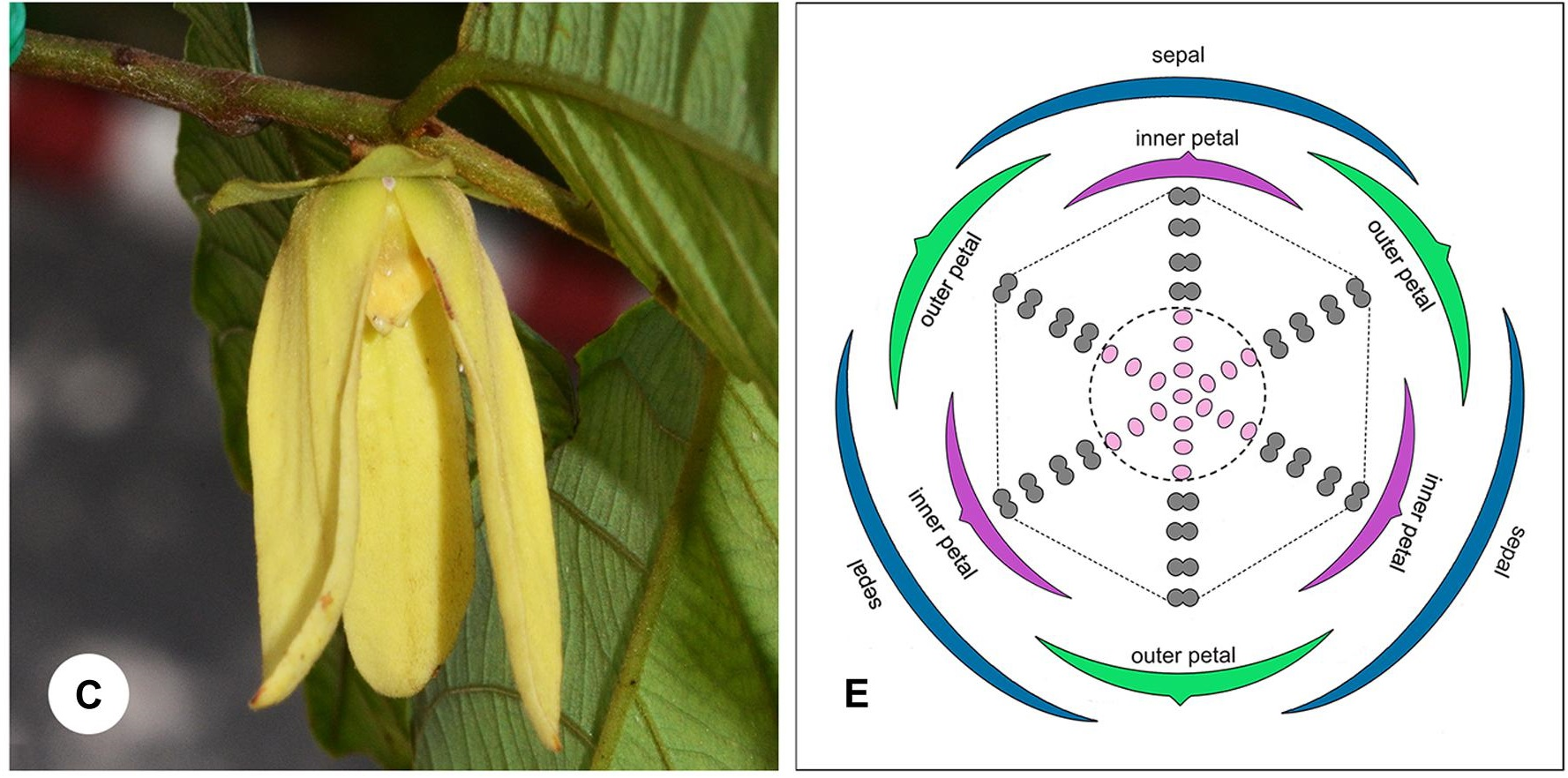
Photograph and axial plane floral diagram of Friesodielsia desmoides, showing the whorled pattern of multiple concentric objects.

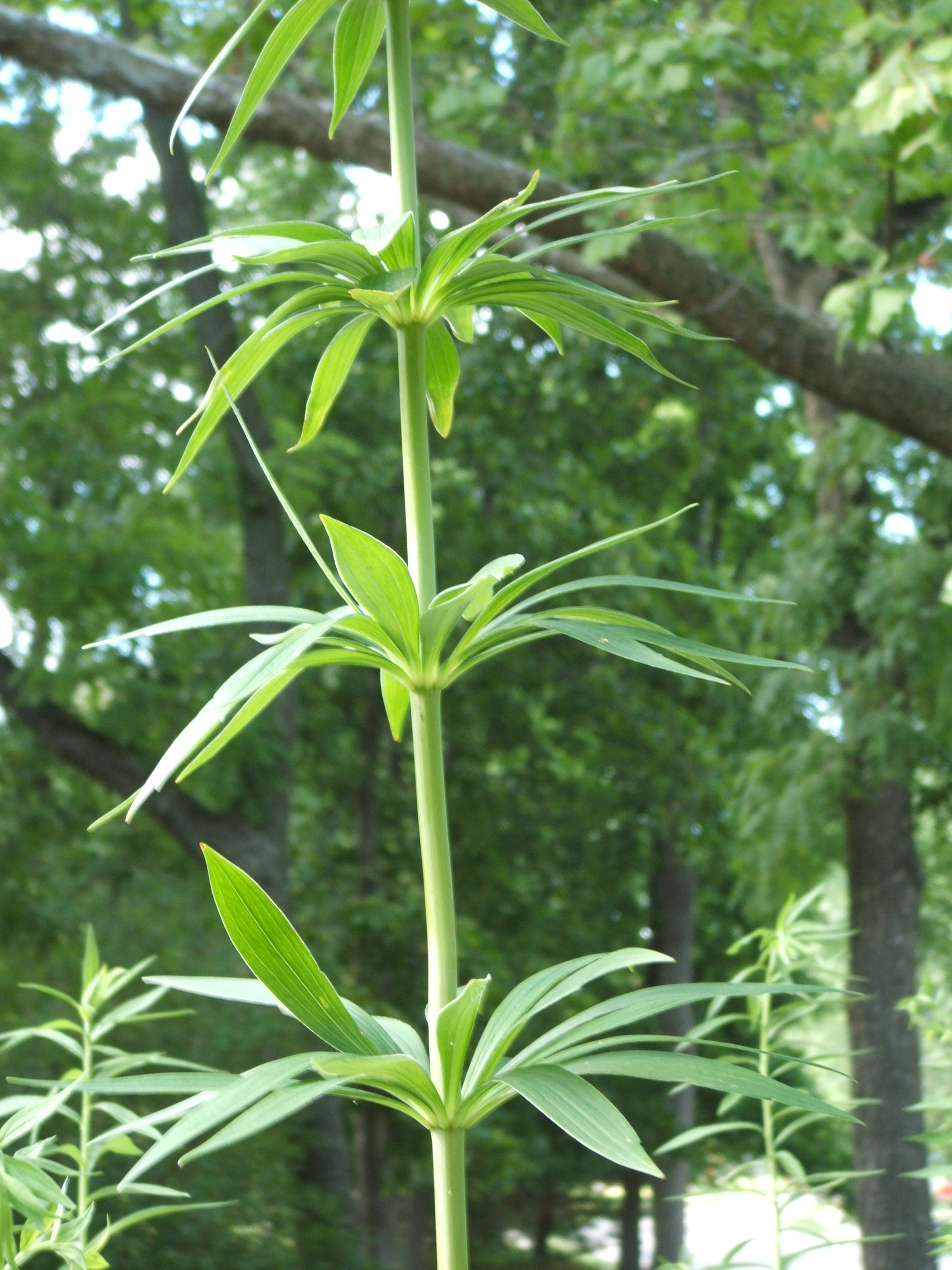
Leaf whorls on a herbaceous Lilium michiganense

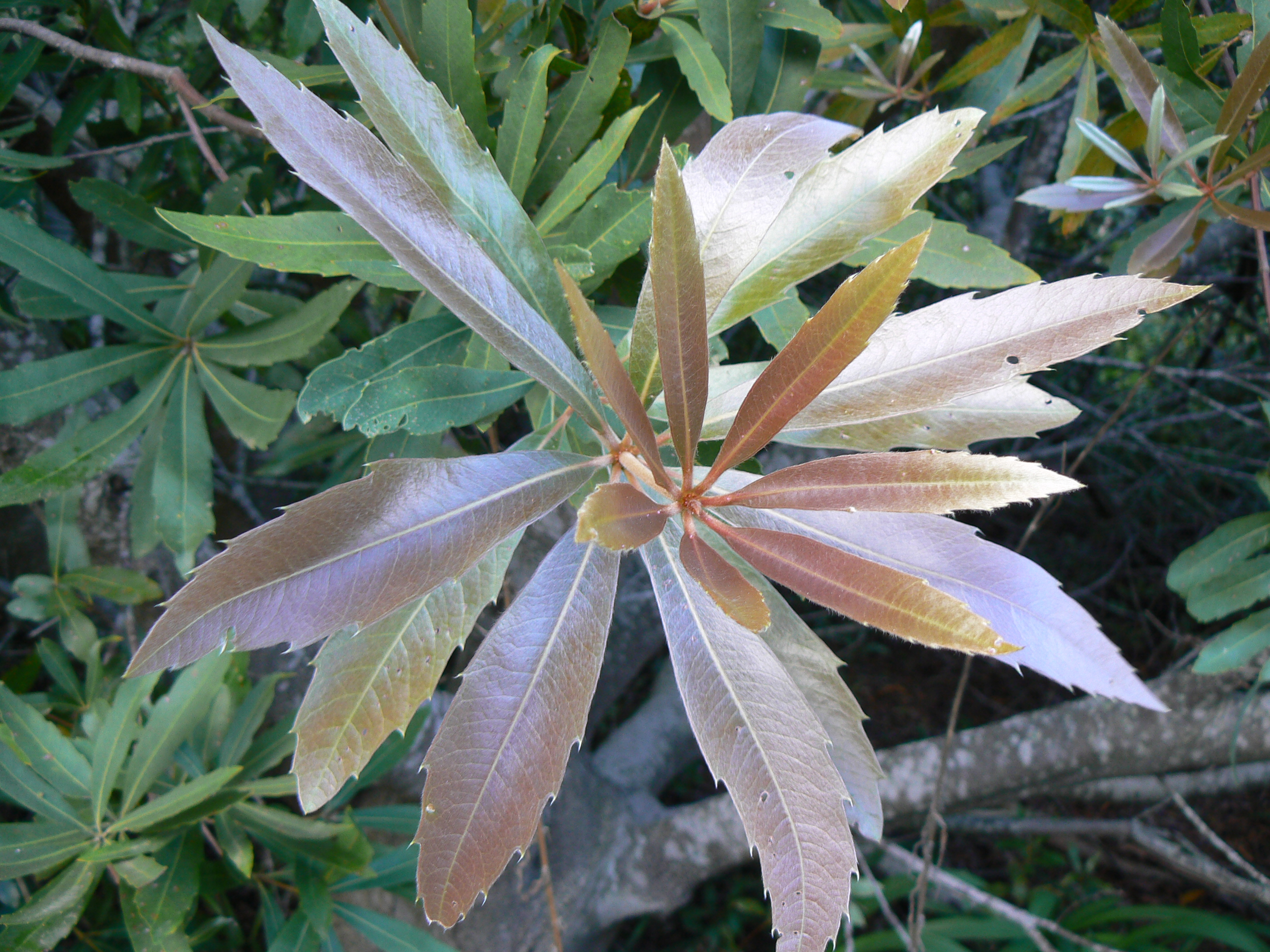
Leaf whorls on a woody tree, Brabejum stellatifolium

In botany, a whorl or verticil is a whorled arrangement of leaves, sepals, petals, stamens, or carpels that radiate from a single point and surround or wrap around the stem or stalk. A leaf whorl consists of at least three elements; a pair of opposite leaves is not called a whorl.

For leaves to grow in whorls is fairly rare except in plant species with very short internodes. Genera with species having whorled leaves include Galium, Nerium, Elodea, and Lilium. Leaf-like bracts may also be whorled (as in Trillium, e.g.). Leaf whorls occur in some trees such as Brabejum stellatifolium and other species in the family Proteaceae (e.g., in the genus Banksia). In plants such as these, crowded internodes within the leaf whorls alternate with long internodes between the whorls.

The morphology of most flowers (called cyclic flowers) is based on four types of whorls:

1. The calyx: zero or more whorls of sepals at the base
2. The corolla: zero or more whorls of petals above the calyx
3. The androecium: zero or more whorls of stamens, each comprising a filament and an anther
4. The gynoecium: zero or more whorls of carpels, each consisting of an ovary, a style, and a stigma

A flower lacking any of these floral structures is said to be incomplete or imperfect. Not all flowers consist of whorls since the parts may instead be spirally arranged, as in the family Magnoliaceae.

== See also ==
- Cyclic flower
- Merosity
- Phyllotaxis
