= Retiniphyllum chloranthum =

Conservation status
- Least Concern (IUCN 3.1)

Scientific classification
- Kingdom: Plantae
- Clade: Tracheophytes
- Clade: Angiosperms
- Clade: Eudicots
- Clade: Asterids
- Order: Gentianales
- Family: Rubiaceae
- Genus: Retiniphyllum
- Species: R. chloranthum

Binomial name
- Retiniphyllum chloranthum Ducke

Species of plant

Retiniphyllum chloranthum is a species of flowering plant in the family Rubiaceae.

It occurs from Colombia to Guyana and northern Brazil.

It was described by Adolpho Ducke in 1943.
