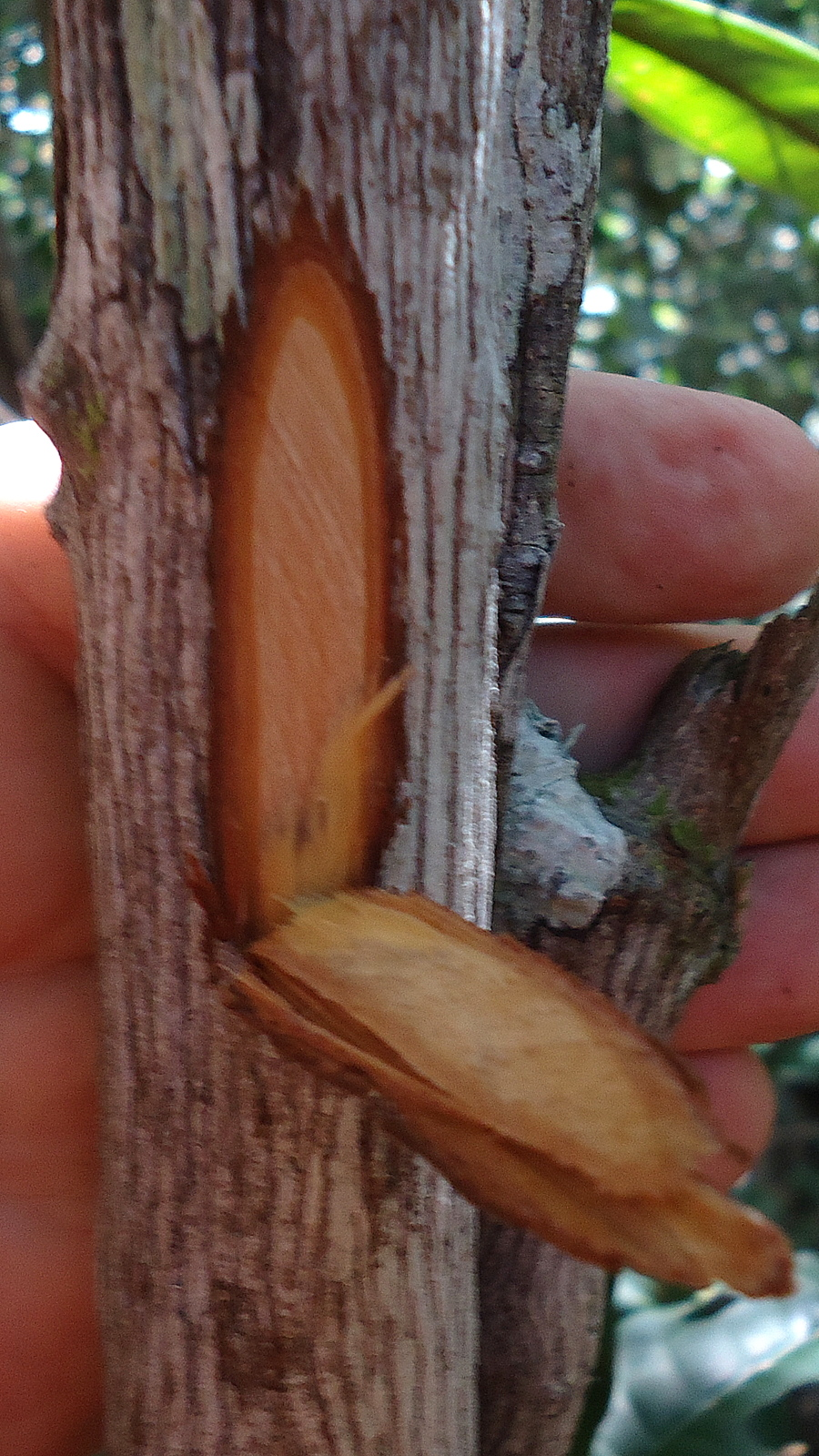

Scientific classification
- Kingdom: Plantae
- Clade: Tracheophytes
- Clade: Angiosperms
- Clade: Eudicots
- Clade: Asterids
- Order: Gentianales
- Family: Rubiaceae
- Subfamily: Ixoroideae
- Tribe: Cordiereae
- Genus: Amaioua; Aubl.

Type species
- Amaioua guianensis Aubl.

Synonyms
- Ehrenbergia Spreng.; Hexactina Willd. ex Schult. & Schult.f.

= Amaioua =

Genus of plants

Amaioua is a genus of flowering plants in the family Rubiaceae. It was first described by Jean Baptiste Aublet in 1775. The genus is native to tropical America from southern Mexico to Brazil, including Cuba and Trinidad.

== Species ==
11 species are accepted:

- Amaioua brevidentata Steyerm. – Venezuela, Guyana
- Amaioua contracta Standl. – Amazonas (state of Brazil)
- Amaioua glomerulata (Lam. ex Poir.) Delprete & C.H.Perss. – southern Mexico and Cuba to Peru and central Brazil
- Amaioua guianensis Aubl. – Brazil, Perú, Ecuador, Colombia, Bolivia, Venezuela, Guyana, Suriname, French Guiana
- Amaioua intermedia Mart. ex Schult. & Schult.f. – Brazil, Perú, Bolivia
- Amaioua longipedicellata Delprete & J.G.Jardim – northeastern Brazil
- Amaioua macrosepala C.H.Perss. & E.Méndez-Varg. – Colombia
- Amaioua magnicarpa Dwyer – Panamá, Colombia
- Amaioua monteiroi Standl. – Pará
- Amaioua pedicellata Dwyer – Costa Rica, Panamá
- Amaioua pilosa K.Schum. – eastern Brazil
