= Glossostipula =

Scientific classification
- Kingdom: Plantae
- Clade: Tracheophytes
- Clade: Angiosperms
- Clade: Eudicots
- Clade: Asterids
- Order: Gentianales
- Family: Rubiaceae
- Subfamily: Ixoroideae
- Tribe: Cordiereae
- Genus: Glossostipula; Lorence

Genus of plants

Glossostipula is a genus of flowering plants in the family Rubiaceae. Species of this genus are native to Mexico, Guatemala, and Honduras.

== Species ==
- Glossostipula blepharophylla (Standl.) Lorence
- Glossostipula concinna (Standl.) Lorence
- Glossostipula strigosa Lorence
