= Devil's garden =

Large stand of trees in the Amazon rainforest

In myrmecology and forest ecology, a devil's garden (Kichwa: Supay chakra) is a large stand of trees in the Amazon rainforest consisting of at most three tree species and the ant Myrmelachista schumanni. Devil's gardens can reach sizes of up to 600 trees and are inhabited by a single ant colony, containing up to 3 million workers and 15,000 queens. In a 2002 to 2004 census of the Amazon, devil's gardens were shown to have grown by 0.7% per year. The relationship between tree and ant may persist for more than 800 years. A devil's garden is considered an example of mutualism, a type of symbiotic relationship between species.

== Background ==
Devil's gardens were named because locals believed that an evil forest spirit Chullachaki (meaning "uneven foot, single foot" in Kichwa) or "Chuyathaqi" lived in them.

== Types ==
Inhabited by the ant Myrmelachista schumanni, devil's gardens, in different regions of the Amazon, can be dominated by different tree species. In southeastern Peru, devil's gardens are dominated by Cordia nodosa (Boraginaceae) and occasionally mixed with Tococa occidentalis (Melastomataceae). At higher elevations, the tree species Tapirira guianensis (Anacardiaceae) can be found dominating gardens. In southeastern Ecuador and northeastern Peru the most common tree species found in devil's gardens are Duroia hirsuta (Rubiaceae).

== Symbiosis ==
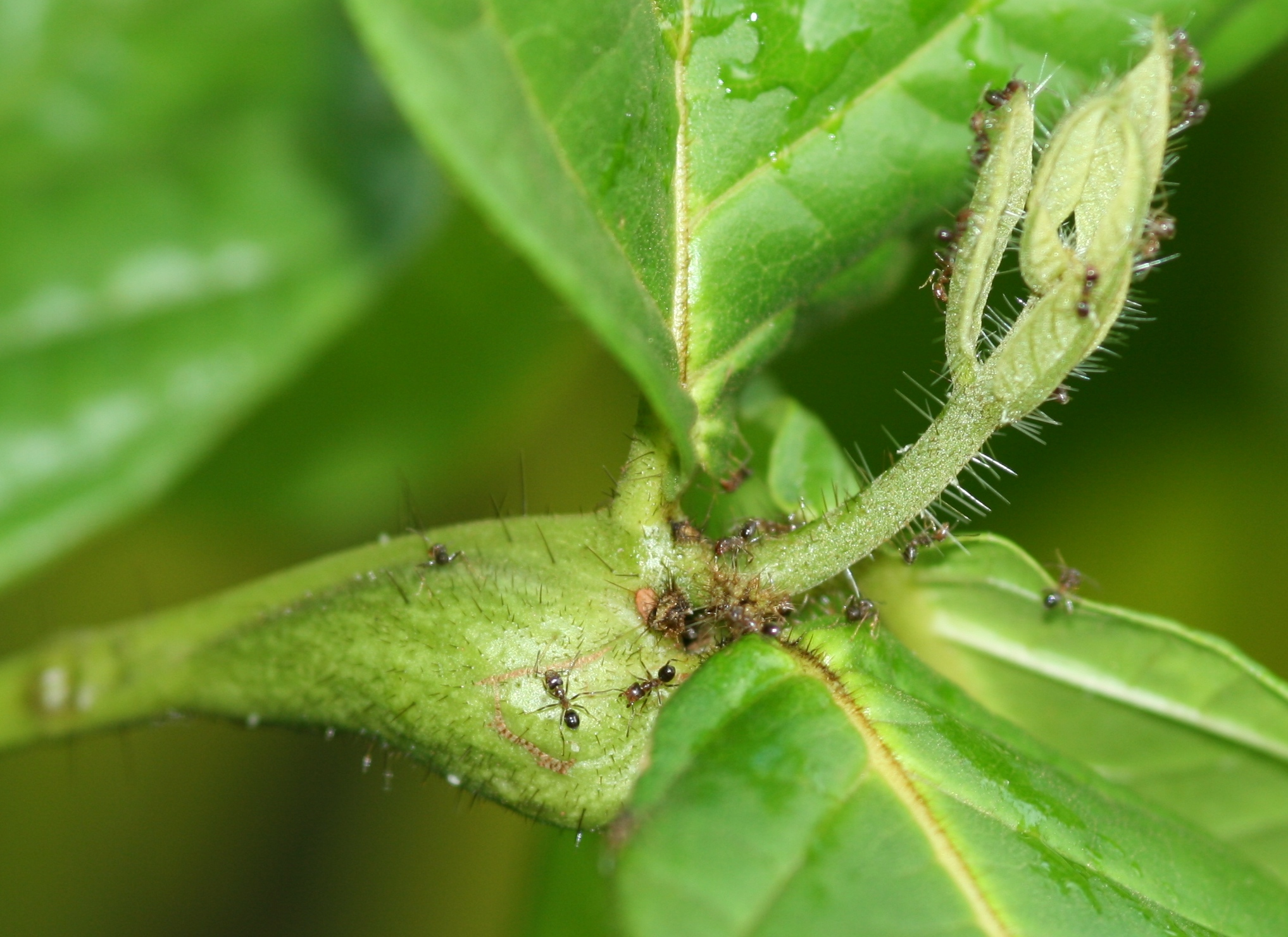
Ants near domatia of Cordia nodosa (Boraginaceae).

The mutualistic symbiosis between the ant Myrmelachista schumanni and the tree Duroia hirsuta begins when an ant queen colonizes an isolated tree. The ants make nesting sites in the hollow stems and leaves of the tree, called domatia. The ants eliminate competition for the tree by poisoning all plants, except the host tree, with formic acid. Because other plants are killed off, D. hirsuta saplings are able to grow and the ant colony is able to expand.

The tree provides shelter (hollow stems and domatia) and food (leaves) for the ants, and the ants provide a suitable environment for the trees to grow by eliminating competing plants. Although the ants fend off herbivores, the size of the garden is restricted by leaf destruction increasing as it expands, as the ants are unable to defend the trees beyond a certain point.
