= Stachyarrhena =

Scientific classification
- Kingdom: Plantae
- Clade: Tracheophytes
- Clade: Angiosperms
- Clade: Eudicots
- Clade: Asterids
- Order: Gentianales
- Family: Rubiaceae
- Subfamily: Ixoroideae
- Tribe: Cordiereae
- Genus: Stachyarrhena; Hook.f.

Genus of flowering plants

Stachyarrhena is a genus of flowering plants belonging to the family Rubiaceae.

Its native range is Panama to Southern Tropical America.

Species:

- Stachyarrhena acuminata Standl.
- Stachyarrhena acutiloba Steyerm.
