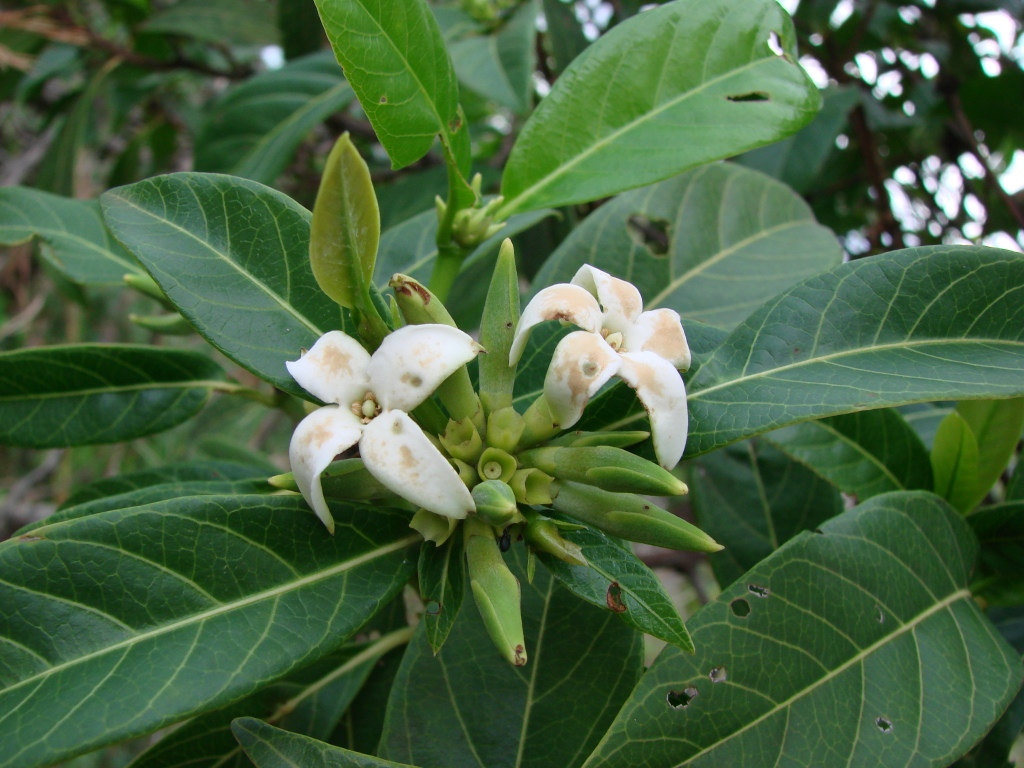
- Flowers and leaves of Alibertia edulis.

Scientific classification
- Kingdom: Plantae
- Clade: Tracheophytes
- Clade: Angiosperms
- Clade: Eudicots
- Clade: Asterids
- Order: Gentianales
- Family: Rubiaceae
- Subfamily: Ixoroideae
- Tribe: Cordiereae
- Genus: Alibertia; A.Rich. ex DC.

Type species
- Alibertia edulis (Rich.) A.Rich. ex DC.

Synonyms
- Borojoa Cuatrec.; Garapatica H.Karst.; Gardeniola Cham.; Genipella Rich. ex DC.; Scepseothamnus Cham.; Thieleodoxa Cham.

= Alibertia (plant) =

Genus of plants

Alibertia is a genus of flowering plants in the family Rubiaceae. It is found in tropical America. They are dioecious trees or shrubs, with white flowers and indehiscent, often fleshy fruit.

== Species ==
As of October 2026, Plants of the World Online accepts the following 16 species:

- Alibertia atlantica (Dwyer) Delprete & C.H.Perss.
- Alibertia bertierifolia K.Schum.
- Alibertia claviflora K.Schum.
- Alibertia curviflora K.Schum.
- Alibertia duckeana Delprete & C.H.Perss.
- Alibertia dwyeri Delprete & C.H.Perss.
- Alibertia edulis (Rich.) A.Rich. ex DC.
- Alibertia latifolia (Benth.) K.Schum.
- Alibertia mahechae Cortés-Ballén, Zapata-Corr. & Delprete
- Alibertia occidentalis Delprete & C.H.Perss.
- Alibertia patinoi (Cuatrec.) Delprete & C.H.Perss.
- Alibertia sorbilis Huber ex Ducke
- Alibertia tessmannii (Standl.) Delprete & C.H.Perss.
- Alibertia utleyorum (Dwyer) C.M.Taylor
- Alibertia venezuelensis (Steyerm.) Delprete & C.H.Perss.
- Alibertia verticillata (Ducke) W.Schultze-Motel
