= Botryarrhena =

Scientific classification
- Kingdom: Plantae
- Clade: Tracheophytes
- Clade: Angiosperms
- Clade: Eudicots
- Clade: Asterids
- Order: Gentianales
- Family: Rubiaceae
- Subfamily: Ixoroideae
- Tribe: Cordiereae
- Genus: Botryarrhena; Ducke

Type species
- Botryarrhena pendula Ducke

Genus of plants

Botryarrhena is a genus of flowering plants in the family Rubiaceae. It was described by Adolpho Ducke in 1932. It only holds two species, occurring in Brazil, Colombia, Peru and Venezuela.

== Species ==
- Botryarrhena pendula Ducke - Venezuela, Colombia, Brazil
- Botryarrhena venezuelensis Steyerm. - Venezuela, Perú
