= Stenosepala =

Scientific classification
- Kingdom: Plantae
- Clade: Tracheophytes
- Clade: Angiosperms
- Clade: Eudicots
- Clade: Asterids
- Order: Gentianales
- Family: Rubiaceae
- Genus: Stenosepala; C.H.Perss.

Genus of plants

Stenosepala is a genus of flowering plants belonging to the family Rubiaceae.

Its native range is Panama to Colombia.

== Species ==
Species:

- Stenosepala hirsuta C.H.Perss.
