= Kutchubaea =

Scientific classification
- Kingdom: Plantae
- Clade: Tracheophytes
- Clade: Angiosperms
- Clade: Eudicots
- Clade: Asterids
- Order: Gentianales
- Family: Rubiaceae
- Subfamily: Ixoroideae
- Tribe: Cordiereae
- Genus: Kutchubaea; Fisch. ex DC.

Genus of plants

Kutchubaea is a genus of plant in the family Rubiaceae. It contains the following species (but this list may be incomplete):

- Kutchubaea insignis
- Kutchubaea neblinensis
- Kutchubaea montana Steyerm.
