= Myrmelachista schumanni =

Scientific classification
- Kingdom: Animalia
- Phylum: Arthropoda
- Class: Insecta
- Order: Hymenoptera
- Family: Formicidae
- Subfamily: Formicinae
- Genus: Myrmelachista
- Species: M. schumanni

Binomial name
- Myrmelachista schumanni Emery, 1890

Species of ant

Myrmelachista schumanni, also known as the lemon ant, is a species of ant from South America. It is notable for the creation of devil's gardens. Using its own herbicide, they kill off all the plants in an area except for the myrmecophytes, or ant-plants, in which they reside.

== Ant–plant mutualism ==
M. schumanni live in large clearings in the rainforest, called devil's gardens, where there is little to no bio-diversity compared to the surrounding area. There are only one to three species of plants found in these areas consisting of Cordia nodosa, Tococa guianensis, or Duroia hirsuta.

The few studies of the mutualism between M. schumanni–D. hirsuta have incorrectly concluded that these clearings are formed by allelopathy on the part of D. hirsuta. It was later established that worker ants were injecting leaves with formic acid, a toxin commonly produced in ant species, and the plants started to die within 24 hours. Lemon ants are the only known insect to use formic acid as a herbicide.

By killing other plants, the lemon ants provide themselves with a nest site, usually residing in D. hirsuta. Researchers estimate that the largest garden observed, contains 328 trees over 1,300 m^{2} (13,990 sq ft) and is around 800 years old.

== Name ==
Lemon ants get their name from the lemony taste of acids produced as part of a glandular chemical defense system. When crushed or attacked, citronellal pheromones are created to communicate alarm to nearby individuals, which also produces a citrus odor. Since these ants have a tangy lemon taste, many tourists in the area give them a try.
