= Cyclic flower =

Type of flower having many whorls

A cyclic flower is a flower type formed out of a series of whorls; sets of identical organs attached around the axis at the same point. Most flowers consist of a single whorl of sepals termed a calyx; a single whorl of petals termed a corolla; one or more whorls of stamens (together termed the androecium); and a single whorl of carpels termed the gynoecium. This is a cyclic arrangement.

Some flowers contain flower parts with a spiral arrangement. Such flowers are not cyclic. However in the common case of spirally arranged sepals on an otherwise cyclic flower, the term hemicyclic may be used.

The suffix -cyclic is used to denote the number of whorls contained within a flower. The most common case is the pentacyclic flower, which contains five whorls: a calyx, a corolla, two whorls of stamens, and a single whorl of carpels. Another common case is the tetracyclic flower, which contains only one whorl of stamens, and therefore only four whorls in total. Tricyclic flowers also occur, generally where there is a single undifferentiated perianth. Flowers with more than five whorls are also not uncommon. The greatest variation occurs in the calyx and the androecium. Calyces of up to nine whorls have been recorded, and up to 12 whorls of stamens have been observed.
