= Vigiland =

Swedish DJ/music producing house music duo

- Origin: Västervik, Sweden
- Genres: House; Melbourne bounce
- Years active: 2013–2024
- Label: Universal Music Group
- Members: Claes Remmered Persson; Otto Pettersson
- Website: vigilandmusic.com

Vigiland was a Swedish house duo consisting of Claes Remmered Persson and Otto Pettersson from the Swedish community Västervik, Sweden. Their first single "Bouncer" became popular on Spotify when it was released in late 2013. Upon releasing their Melbourne Bounce-influenced single "UFO", it made the top 10 of Spotify's most played songs. With the release of their single "Shots & Squats", Vigiland achieved number-ones in Scandinavia over summer and autumn 2015. "Shots & Squats" also became popular in Latin America due to Vine and after it was used as the theme for the MTV series SuperShore. In 2016, Vigiland released "Pong Dance", which reached number 2 in Sweden.

In October 2024, Vigiland disbanded and moved on as Soda Music. As proved from YouTube comments on Soda's new podcast by the name of "Tech This Out", they technically confirmed that the Vigiland term is now dead. The release "Island" with Raaban and Jonas Wallin is their final single.

== Discography ==
=== Singles ===
Year	Title	Peak positions						Certifications
Year	Title	SWE	DEN	FIN	GER	NED	NOR	Certifications
2014	"UFO"	1	11	—	75	—	10	GLF: 6× Platinum; BVMI: Gold; IFPI DEN: Platinum
2014	"Okay"	—	—	—	—	—	—	
2014	"Shots & Squats" (featuring Tham Sway)	2	7	3	—	94	13	GLF: 5× Platinum; BVMI: Gold; IFPI DEN: Platinum
2015	"Addicted" (featuring Alexander Tidebrink)	25	—	—	—	—	—	GLF: Platinum
2016	"Pong Dance"	2	19	14	—	—	—	GLF: 4× Platinum; IFPI DEN: 2× Platinum
2016	"Let's Escape"	64	—	—	—	—	—	
2017	"Friday Night"	6	—	—	—	—	36	GLF: 3× Platinum; BVMI: Gold; IFPI DEN: Platinum
2017	"Another Shot"	43	—	—	—	—	—	
2018	"Be Your Friend" (featuring Alexander Tidebrink)	7	—	—	—	—	—	GLF: 4× Platinum; IFPI DEN: Gold
2018	"Take This Ride"	33	—	—	—	—	—	
2018	"Nice to Meet You" (featuring Alexander Tidebrink)	68	—	—	—	—	—	
2018	"Never Going Home"	50	—	—	—	—	—	
2018	"Mad Love" (with Moti)	—	—	—	—	—	—	
2019	"Strangers" (featuring A7S)	66	—	—	—	—	—	
2019	"We're the Same" (featuring Alexander Tidebrink)	24	—	—	—	—	—	
2019	"Already Let You Go" (featuring Anthony E.)	— (Note: "Already Let You Go" did not enter the Swedish Singellista Chart, but peaked at number one on the Swedish Heatseeker Chart.)	—	—	—	—	—	
2020	"Chicago"	—	—	—	—	—	—	
2020	"Talk About It" (with Mangos)	—	—	—	—	—	—	
2020	"In My Soul"	—	—	—	—	—	—	
2020	"We Don't Talk Enough" (with Mha)	—	—	—	—	—	—	
2020	"In My Soul"	—	—	—	—	—	—	
2020	"Beat Hits"	—	—	—	—	—	—	
"—" denotes a recording that did not chart or was not released in that territory.
