= Verticordia albida =

Conservation status
- Endangered (EPBC Act)

Scientific classification
- Kingdom: Plantae
- Clade: Embryophytes
- Clade: Tracheophytes
- Clade: Angiosperms
- Clade: Eudicots
- Clade: Rosids
- Order: Myrtales
- Family: Myrtaceae
- Genus: Verticordia
- Subgenus: Verticordia subg. Eperephes
- Section: Verticordia sect. Pennuligera
- Species: V. albida

Binomial name
- Verticordia albida A.S.George

Species of shrub

Verticordia albida is a species of flowering plant in the myrtle family, Myrtaceae and is endemic to the south-west of Western Australia. It is a shrub with one main stem with many branches and spike-like groups of scented, white feathery flowers with a pink centre.

== Description ==
Verticordia albida is a shrub which grows to a height of 1–3 m (3–10 ft) and a width of 0.6–2 m (2–7 ft) and has a single, highly branched stem. The leaves are elliptic in shape, dished, 3–6 mm (0.1–0.2 in) long, 2–3 mm (0.08–0.1 in) wide and lack a stalk.

The flowers are scented, arranged in dense spikes, each flower white with a pink centre and a stalk about 2 mm (0.08 in) long. The sepals are about 6 mm (0.2 in) long and have 10 to 13 feathery lobes. The petals are 4–5 mm (0.16–0.20 in) long and have a fringe about 1 mm (0.04 in) long. The style is about 6 mm (0.2 in), curved near the top with a few hairs less than 1 mm (0.04 in) long. Flowering time is from November to January.

== Taxonomy and naming ==
Verticordia albida was first formally described by Alex George in 1991 from specimens collected near Three Springs and the description was published in Nuytsia. The specific epithet (albida) is from the Latin albidus (whitish), in reference to the sepals and petals".

George placed this species in subgenus Eperephes, section Pennuligera along with V. comosa, V. lepidophylla, V. chrysostachys, V. dichroma, V. x eurardyensis, V. muelleriana, V. argentea, V. aereiflora, V. fragrans, V. venusta, V. forrestii, V. serotina, V. oculata, V. etheliana and V. grandis.

== Distribution and habitat ==
This verticordia grows in sand near or over gravel, often with other verticordias in woodland or shrubland in a small area near Three Springs in the Avon Wheatbelt and Geraldton Sandplains biogeographic regions.

== Conservation ==
Verticordia albida is classified as "Threatened Flora (Declared Rare Flora — Extant)" by the Western Australian Government Department of Parks and Wildlife and an Interim Recovery Plan has been prepared. It has also been listed as "Endangered" (EN) under the Australian Government Environment Protection and Biodiversity Conservation Act 1999 (EPBC Act).

== Use in horticulture ==
It is difficult to propagate this verticordia from cuttings but it has been successfully grafted onto Chamelaucium uncinatum rootstock. Tissue culture has also been used successfully at Kings Park, Western Australia.
