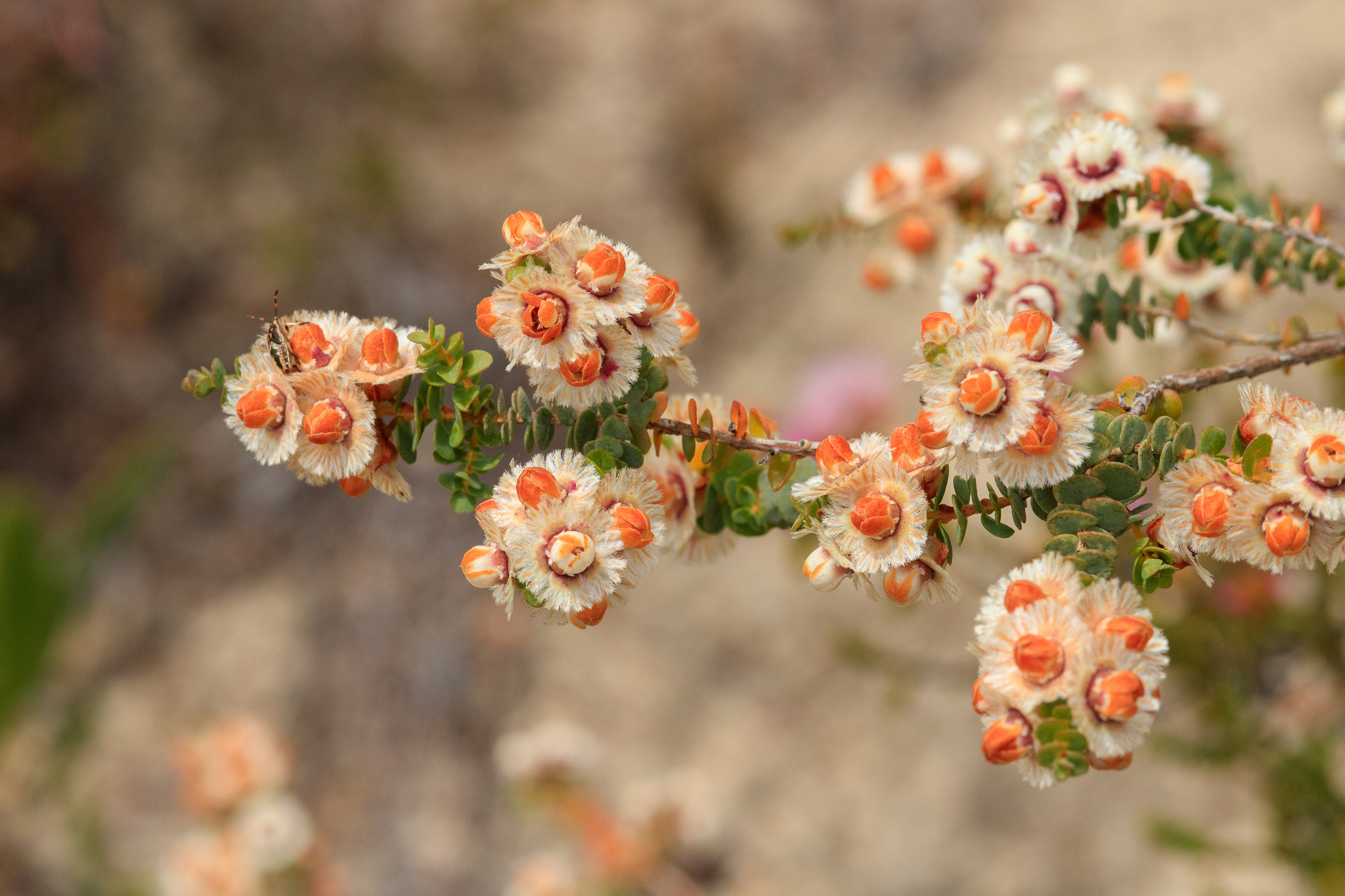

Conservation status
- Priority Three — Poorly Known Taxa (DEC)

Scientific classification
- Kingdom: Plantae
- Clade: Embryophytes
- Clade: Tracheophytes
- Clade: Spermatophytes
- Clade: Angiosperms
- Clade: Eudicots
- Clade: Rosids
- Order: Myrtales
- Family: Myrtaceae
- Genus: Verticordia
- Subgenus: Verticordia subg. Eperephes
- Section: Verticordia sect. Pennuligera
- Species: V. fragrans

Binomial name
- Verticordia fragrans A.S.George

= Verticordia fragrans =

Hollyhock verticordia

Species of flowering plant

Verticordia fragrans, commonly known as hollyhock verticordia, is a species of flowering plant in the myrtle family, Myrtaceae and is endemic to the south-west of Western Australia. It is an openly branched shrub with egg-shaped leaves and spikes of sweetly scented, pink and white flowers in spring and early summer.

== Description ==
Verticordia fragrans is a shrub which grows to a height of 0.45–3 m (1–10 ft) and a width of 0.45–1 m (1–3 ft) and has a single, openly branched stem at its base. The leaves are thin, egg-shaped to elliptic or almost round in shape, 1.5–4 mm (0.06–0.2 in) long.

The flowers are sweetly scented, arranged in spreading spike-like groups, each flower on a stalk about 1.5–3 mm (0.06–0.1 in) long. The sepals are pink, rarely white, 3.5–4 mm (0.14–0.16 in) long and have 6 to 9 white feathery lobes. The petals are erect, deep to pale pink or rarely white, 4.0–4.5 mm (0.16–0.18 in) long, about 3 mm (0.1 in) wide with a few short hairs around the edge. The style is 5 mm (0.2 in), curved near the top with a few hairs near the tip. Flowering time is from October to November or December.

== Taxonomy and naming ==
Verticordia fragrans was first formally described by Alex George in 1991 from specimens collected near Eneabba and the description was published in Nuytsia. The specific epithet (fragrans) is from the Latin word fragrantia meaning "fragrant" referring to the scented flowers.

George placed this species in subgenus Eperephes, section Pennuligera along with V. comosa, V. lepidophylla, V. chrysostachys, V. aereiflora, V. dichroma, V. x eurardyensis, V. muelleriana, V. argentea, V. albida, V. forrestii, V. venusta, V. serotina, V. oculata, V. etheliana and V. grandis.

== Distribution and habitat ==
This verticordia grows in sand, sometimes with or over clay, loam or sandstone, often with other verticordia species in woodland or shrubland. It is found near Eneabba and Coomallo in the Geraldton Sandplains biogeographic region.

== Conservation ==
Verticordia fragrans is classified as "Priority Three" meaning that it is poorly known and known from only a few locations but is not under imminent threat.

== Use in horticulture ==
It is usually propagated from cuttings and is easy to grow in full sun or part shade. It is both drought and frost tolerant and has grown well in Sydney, near the sea as well as inland in Western Australia.
