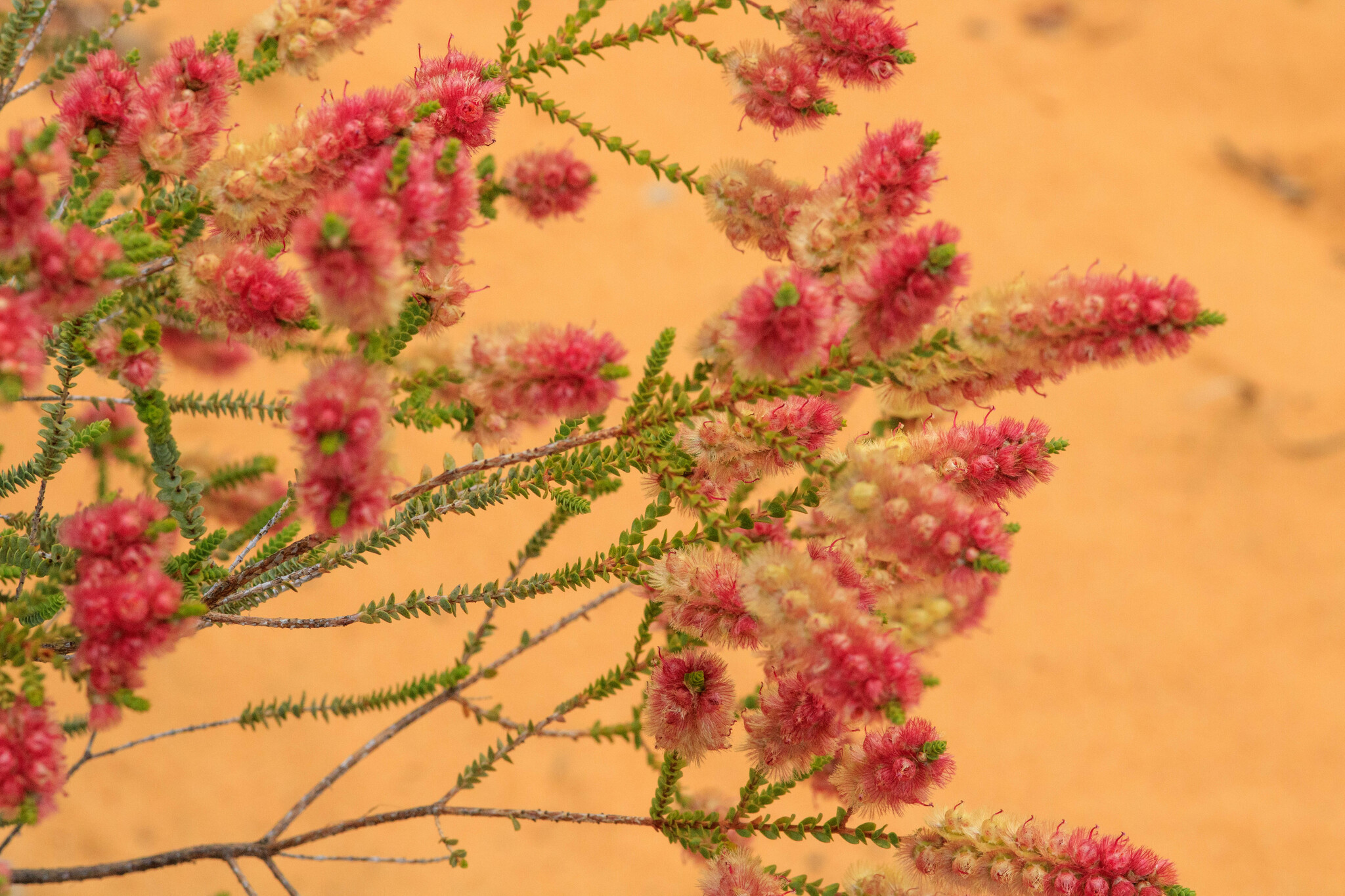

Conservation status
- Priority One — Poorly Known Taxa (DEC)

Scientific classification
- Kingdom: Plantae
- Clade: Tracheophytes
- Clade: Angiosperms
- Clade: Eudicots
- Clade: Rosids
- Order: Myrtales
- Family: Myrtaceae
- Genus: Verticordia
- Subgenus: Verticordia subg. Eperephes
- Section: Verticordia sect. Pennuligera
- Species: V. × eurardyensis

Binomial name
- Verticordia × eurardyensis Eliz.George & A.S.George

= Verticordia × eurardyensis =

Eurardy magenta

Species of flowering plant

Verticordia × eurardyensis, commonly known as Eurardy magenta, is a species of flowering plant in the myrtle family, Myrtaceae and is endemic to a small area in the south-west of Western Australia. It is a shrub similar to both Verticordia dichroma and Verticordia spicata which grow in the same area and is thought to be a stable hybrid between those two species. It has mostly egg-shaped leaves and spike-like groups of dark magenta-coloured flowers which fade to straw-coloured, in late spring and early summer.

== Description ==
Verticordia × eurardyensis is a shrub which grows to a height of 0.3–1.0 m (1–3 ft) and up to 0.45 m (1 ft) wide. The leaves are arranged in decussate pairs, egg-shaped to elliptic, dished and 1–4 mm (0.04–0.2 in) long. Their margins are slightly hairy or have minute teeth.

The flowers are scented and arranged in spike-like groups near the ends of the branches, each flower on a spreading stalk about 0.5 mm (0.02 in) long. The floral cup is top-shaped, about 3 mm (0.1 in) long, has 5 ribs, large green appendages and is glabrous and wrinkled. The sepals are about 5 mm (0.20 in) long, dark magenta to maroon and spreading, with 8 to 11 feathery lobes. The petals are the same colour as the sepals, about 3 mm (0.1 in) long and erect with a fringe a further 2 mm (0.08 in) long. The style is about 6 mm (0.2 in) long, hairy and bent near the tip. Flowering time is from October to December. The plants appear to be a stable hybrid between two verticordia species - V. dichroma and v. spicata, both of which occur in the same area.

== Taxonomy and naming ==
Verticordia × eurardyensis was first formally described by Elizabeth and Alex George in 1994 from a specimen collected from Eurardy Reserve. The description was published in Nuytsia. The specific epithet (× eurardyensis) is derived from the location where the species is found.

George placed this species in subgenus Eperephes, section Pennuligera along with V. comosa, V. chrysostachys, V. lepidophylla, V. aereiflora, V. dichroma, V. muelleriana, V. argentea, V. albida, V. fragrans, V. venusta, V. forrestii, V. serotina, V. oculata, V. etheliana and V. grandis.

== Distribution and habitat ==
This verticordia grows in sand in low heath and shrubland. It only occurs in Eurardy Reserve, a former pastoral station north of Kalbarri National Park in the Geraldton Sandplains biogeographic region.

== Conservation ==
Verticordia × eurardyensis is classified as "Priority One" by the Western Australian Government Department of Parks and Wildlife, meaning that it is known from only one or a few locations which are potentially at risk.

== Use in horticulture ==
Only a few specimens of Verticordia × eurardyensis have been propagated and only in Kings Park Botanic Garden.
