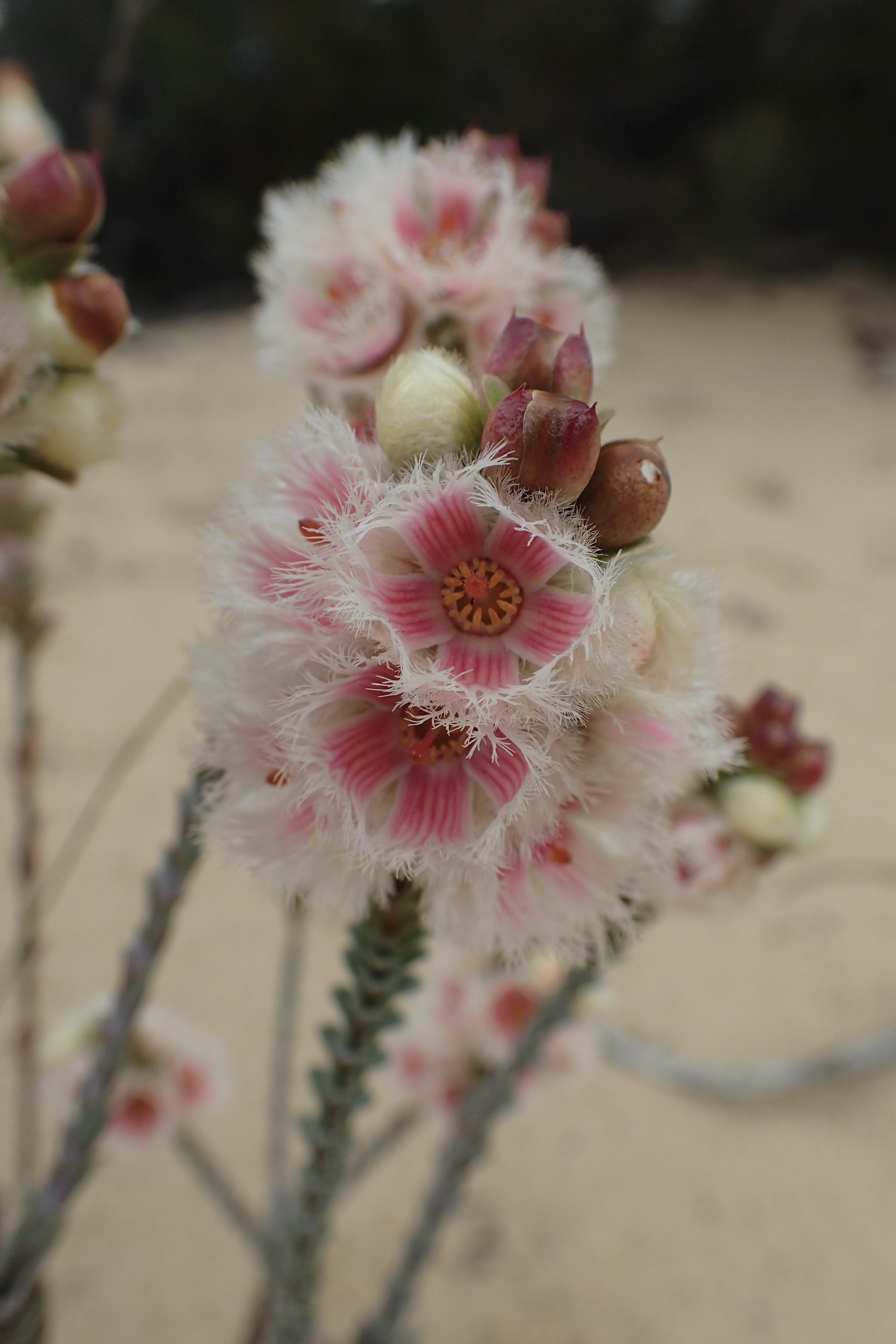
- Verticordia ovalifolia, near Tarin Rock, west of Lake Grace

Scientific classification
- Kingdom: Plantae
- Clade: Tracheophytes
- Clade: Angiosperms
- Clade: Eudicots
- Clade: Rosids
- Order: Myrtales
- Family: Myrtaceae
- Genus: Verticordia
- Subgenus: Verticordia subg. Eperephes
- Section: Verticordia sect. Corynatoca
- Species: V. ovalifolia

Binomial name
- Verticordia ovalifolia Meisn.

= Verticordia ovalifolia =

Oval-leaved featherflower

Species of flowering plant

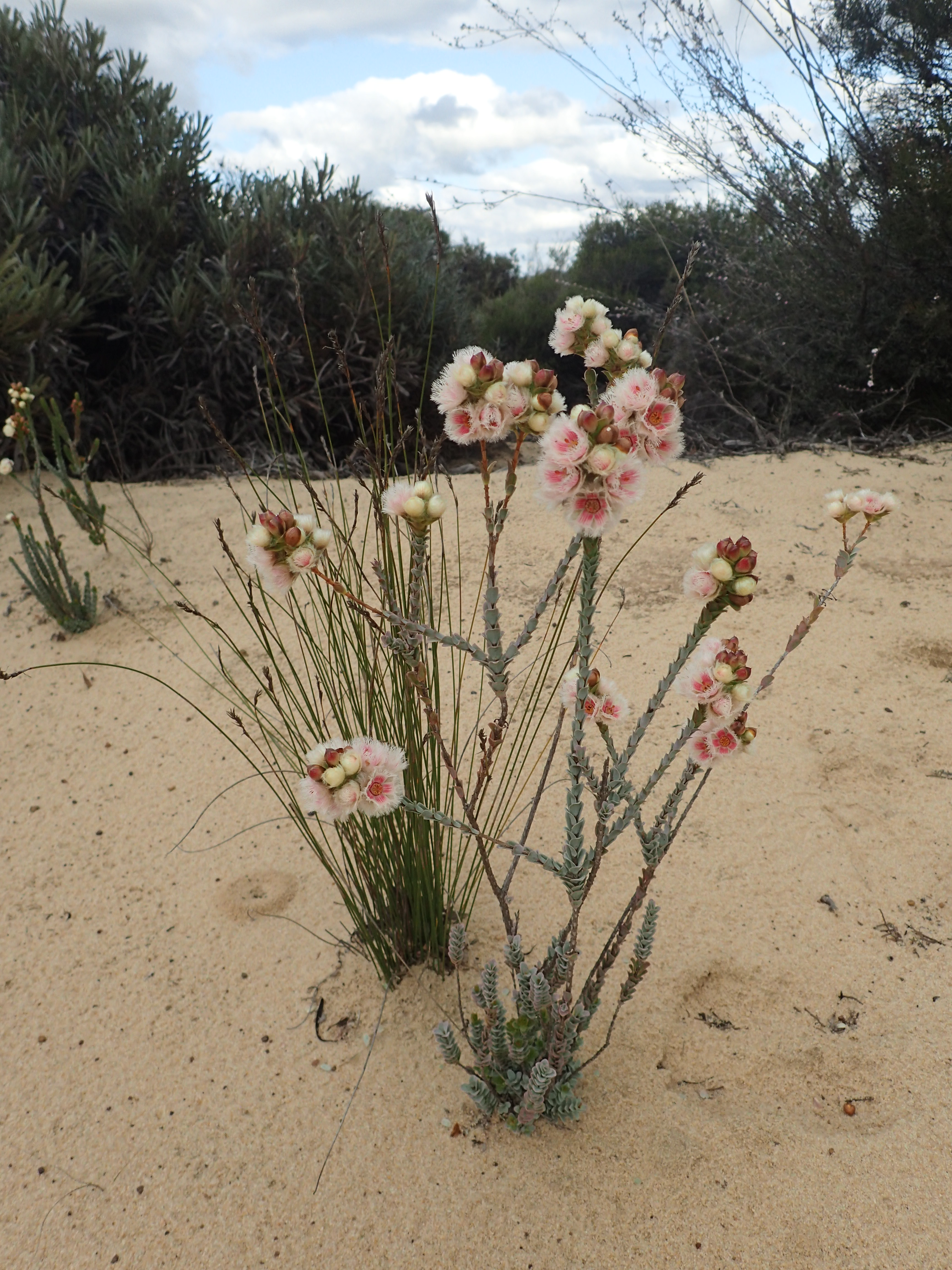
Habit

Verticordia ovalifolia, commonly known as oval-leaved featherflower, is a flowering plant in the myrtle family, Myrtaceae and is endemic to the south-west of Western Australia. It is an openly branched shrub with egg-shaped leaves and strap-like, feathery petals in spring.

== Description ==
Verticordia ovalifolia is a shrub which usually grows to a height of up to 80 cm (31 in) and 90 cm (35 in) wide with several main stems and a few side branches. Its leaves are elliptic or egg-shaped, 4–7 mm (0.16–0.28 in) long, with translucent edges.

The flowers are lightly scented and arranged in rounded groups near the ends of the branches, each flower on a stalk 6–8 mm (0.24–0.31 in) long. The floral cup is top-shaped, about 3 mm (0.12 in) long and glabrous with small appendages around its edge. The sepals are green, 5–8 mm (0.20–0.31 in) long with ten to thirteen cream to pink, feathery lobes and two small, ear-like, hairy appendages. The petals are cream to reddish or purplish, erect, 8–9 mm (0.31–0.35 in) long, oblong to wedge-shaped and strap-like with a deeply divided outer edge. The style is 7–8 mm (0.28–0.31 in) long, straight and densely hairy near the tip. Flowering time is from August to December.

== Taxonomy and naming ==
Verticordia ovalifolia was first formally described by Carl Meisner in 1857 from a specimen collected by James Drummond and the description was published in Journal of the Proceedings of the Linnean Society, Botany. The specific epithet (ovalifolia) is "from the Latin ovalis (oval) and folium (a leaf), in reference to the leaf shape".

When Alex George reviewed the genus Verticordia in 1991, he placed this species in subgenus Eperephes, the only species in section Corynatoca.

== Distribution and habitat ==
This verticordia usually grows in sand, sometimes with lateritic gravel, often with other species of Verticordia, usually in heath and shrubland. It occurs in two disjunct areas between Perth and Geraldton and another between Dumbleyung and Lake King in the Avon Wheatbelt, Geraldton Sandplains, Jarrah Forest, Mallee and Swan Coastal Plain biogeographic regions.

== Conservation status ==
Verticordia ovalifolia is classified as "not threatened" by the Western Australian Government Department of Parks and Wildlife.

== Use in horticulture ==
Oval-leaved featherflower is described as "a beautiful, attractively foliaged shrub" which has been grown in gardens and in pots in a range of well-drained soils. It is usually propagated from cuttings although it can also be grown from seed. Grafting onto Chamelaucium uncinatum rootstock has produced bushy shrubs that bear large numbers of flowers.
