= Leioproctus vitrifrons =

Scientific classification
- Kingdom: Animalia
- Phylum: Arthropoda
- Clade: Pancrustacea
- Class: Insecta
- Order: Hymenoptera
- Family: Colletidae
- Genus: Leioproctus
- Species: L. vitrifrons

Binomial name
- Leioproctus vitrifrons (Smith, 1879)

Synonyms
- Dasycolletes vitrifrons Smith, 1879; Euryglossidia eraduensis Cockerell, 1929

Species of bee

Leioproctus vitrifrons, or Leioproctus (Euryglossidia) vitrifrons, is a species of bee in the family Colletidae and subfamily Colletinae. It is endemic to Australia. It was described by English entomologist Frederick Smith in 1879.

== Distribution and habitat ==
The species occurs in south-west Western Australia. Type localities include Swan River and Eradu.

== Behaviour ==
The adults are flying mellivores. Flowering plants visited by the bees include Chamelaucium uncinatum.

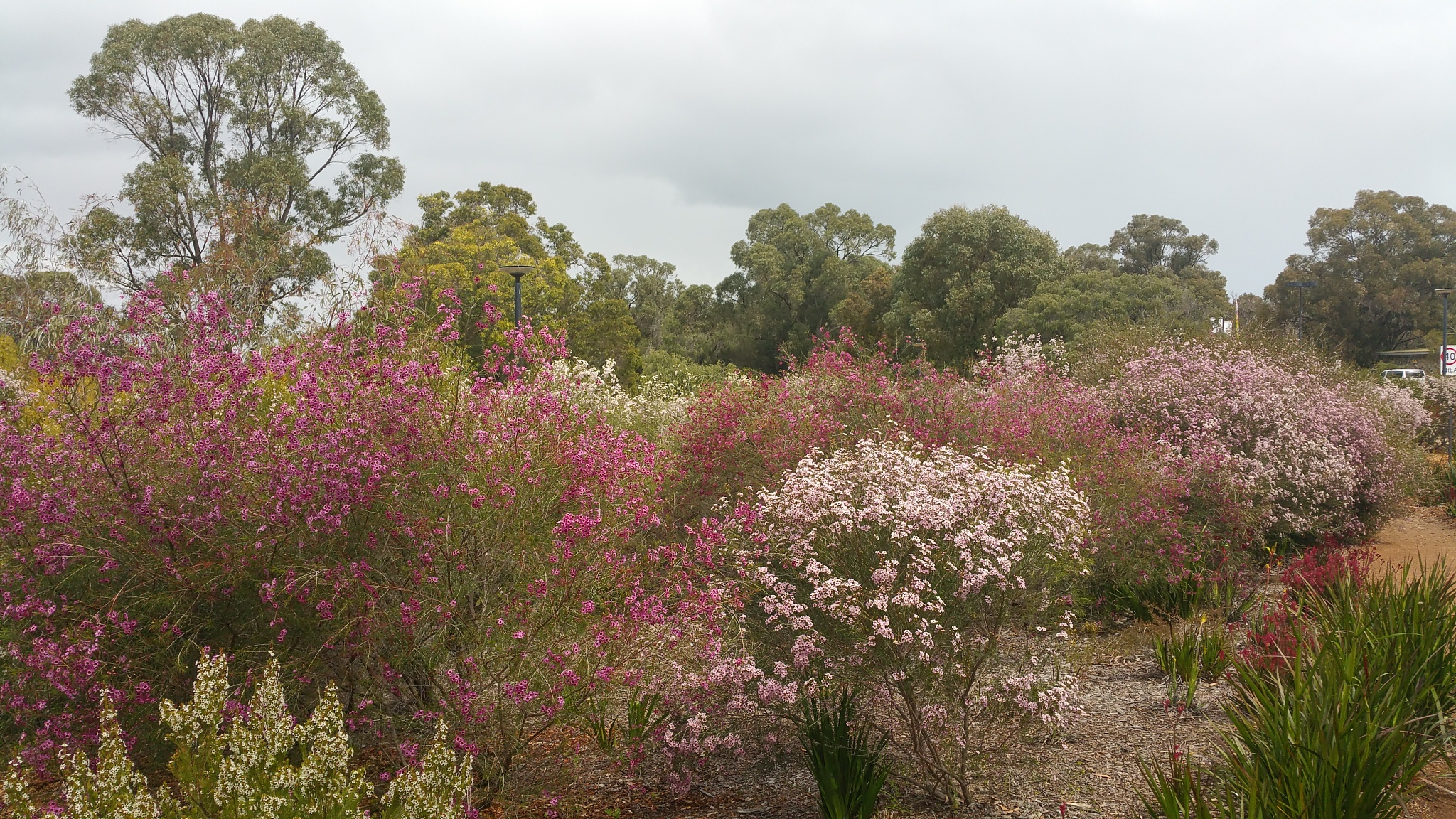
Chamelaucium uncinatum (Geraldton waxflower) is a forage plant of the bees.
