= Verticordia sect. Pennuligera =

Scientific classification
- Kingdom: Plantae
- Clade: Tracheophytes
- Clade: Angiosperms
- Clade: Eudicots
- Clade: Rosids
- Order: Myrtales
- Family: Myrtaceae
- Genus: Verticordia
- Subgenus: Verticordia subg. Eperephes
- Section: Verticordia sect. Pennuligera; Meisner

Species
- See text

Group of shrubs

Verticordia sect. Pennuligera is one of six sections in the subgenus Eperephes. It includes sixteen shrub species in the genus Verticordia. Plants in this section range from small and spreading to large shrubs and have been referred to as "lettuce-leaved" or "round-leaved". The flowers are relatively large, with their sepals having feathered lobes and ear-like appendages on a stalk so that the appendages cover the floral cup. The petals are oval to egg-shaped or round and are usually fringed.

In 1857, Carl Meissner proposed separating the genus Verticordia into four sections and formally described section Pennuligera. The description was published in Journal of the Proceedings of the Linnean Society, Botany. When Alex George reviewed the genus in 1991, he retained Meissner's name and description of the section, nominated V. grandis as the type species and included sixteen species.

The type species for this section is Verticordia grandis and the other species are V. comosa, V. lepidophylla, V. chrysostachys, V. aereiflora, V. dichroma, V. × eurardyensis, V. muelleriana, V. argentea, V. albida, V. fragrans, V. venusta, V. forrestii, V. serotina, V. oculata and V. etheliana.
