= Verticordia sect. Corynatoca =

Scientific classification
- Kingdom: Plantae
- Clade: Tracheophytes
- Clade: Angiosperms
- Clade: Eudicots
- Clade: Rosids
- Order: Myrtales
- Family: Myrtaceae
- Genus: Verticordia
- Subgenus: Verticordia subg. Eperephes
- Section: Verticordia sect. Corynatoca; A.S.George

Type species
- Verticordia ovalifolia Meisn.

Group of flowering plants

Verticordia sect. Corynatoca is one of six sections in the subgenus Eperephes. It includes the single species Verticordia ovalifolia. Plants in this section are sometimes bushy shrubs, sometimes tall and open. The flower cup has very short appendages and the staminodes have raised glands on their surface.

When Alex George reviewed the genus in 1991 he described the section and gave it the name Corynatoca. The name "Corynatoca" is from the Greek koryne (a club) and atakos (barren), referring to the unusual staminodes.

The type and only species in this section is Verticordia ovalifolia.
