= Verticordia etheliana var. etheliana =

Scientific classification
- Kingdom: Plantae
- Clade: Tracheophytes
- Clade: Angiosperms
- Clade: Eudicots
- Clade: Rosids
- Order: Myrtales
- Family: Myrtaceae
- Genus: Verticordia
- Species: V. etheliana C.A.Gardner
- Variety: V. e. var. etheliana

Trinomial name
- Verticordia etheliana var. etheliana

Variety of flowering plant

Verticordia etheliana var. etheliana is a flowering plant in the myrtle family, Myrtaceae and is endemic to the south-west of Western Australia. It is a shrub with one highly branched main stem, egg-shaped to almost round leaves and spike-like groups of bright red flowers with greenish-cream centres. It differs from V. etheliana var. formosa in having longer leaves, and larger flowers.

== Description ==
Verticordia etheliana var. etheliana is an openly branched shrub which grows to a height of 0.3–1.5 m (1–5 ft), a width of 0.3–2 m (1–7 ft) and which has one stem at its base. The leaves are almost round, 3–6 mm (0.1–0.2 in) long, sometimes with a few irregular teeth on the edges.

The flowers are arranged in small, open groups on stalks 6–10 mm (0.2–0.4 in) long and all open at about the same time. The floral cup is top-shaped, 3–5 mm (0.1–0.2 in) long, glabrous and smooth with curved green appendages. The sepals are orange-red, 9–10 mm (0.35–0.39 in) long, with 8 to 16 feathery lobes. When the petals open they are creamish-white with a pink tinge on the edge but turn all red within a day or two, then gradually fade to pale yellowish-pink. They are 6–10 mm (0.2–0.4 in) long, with a feathery edge and 2 ear-shaped appendages at their base. The style is 16–20 mm (0.6–0.8 in) long, initially curled within the bud then gradually straightening, extending well beyond the flower as it opens and has simple hairs. Flowering time is from July to November or December.

== Taxonomy and naming ==
Verticordia etheliana was first formally described by Charles Gardner in 1942 and the description was published in the Journal of the Royal Society of Western Australia. In 1991, Alex George undertook a review of the genus Verticordia and described two varieties of V. etheliana including this one.

== Distribution and habitat ==
This variety grows in sand, gravelly or sandy loam in tall open shrubland between the Billabong Roadhouse and Kalbarri National Park in the Geraldton Sandplains and Yalgoo biogeographic regions.

== Conservation ==
Verticordia etheliana var. etheliana is classified as "not threatened" by the Western Australian Government Department of Parks and Wildlife.

== Use in horticulture ==
The best forms of this shrub are robust, bushy plants growing to a height of 1 m (3 ft) with attractive foliage and spectacular flowers which attract birds and insects. Propagation is usually from cuttings and the plants do best in sandy soils over deeper loamy clay which help to retain moisture. This variety has been grown in Sydney where it sometimes flowers from July to April and appears to be moderately tolerant of frost.
