= Verticordia etheliana var. formosa =

Scientific classification
- Kingdom: Plantae
- Clade: Tracheophytes
- Clade: Angiosperms
- Clade: Eudicots
- Clade: Rosids
- Order: Myrtales
- Family: Myrtaceae
- Genus: Verticordia
- Species: V. etheliana
- Variety: V. e. var. formosa

Trinomial name
- Verticordia etheliana var. formosa A.S.George

Variety of flowering plant

Verticordia etheliana var. formosa is a flowering plant in the myrtle family, Myrtaceae and is endemic to the south-west of Western Australia. It is a compact shrub similar to var. etheliana but with smaller leaves and flowers.

== Description ==
Verticordia etheliana var. formosa is a compact, sometimes almost prostrate shrub with horizontal branches. It usually grows to a height of 30–45 cm (10–20 in) and a width of 0.3–1 m (1–3 ft) but is sometimes at tall as 1 m (3 ft). The leaves are elliptic to egg-shaped, 2–3 mm (0.08–0.1 in) long and are greyish to bluish-green, sometimes with a few irregular teeth on the edges.

The flowers are arranged in rather dense groups on stalks 3–5 mm (0.1–0.2 in) long. The floral cup is top-shaped, 3–5 mm (0.1–0.2 in) long, glabrous and smooth with curved green appendages. The sepals are bright to dark red, often creamish-green at the base, 7–8 mm (0.28–0.31 in) long, with 8 to 16 feathery lobes. When the petals are open they are white, becoming red with age and are 6–7 mm (0.2–0.3 in) long, with a feathery edge and 2 ear-shaped appendages at their base. The style is 12–15 mm (0.5–0.6 in) long, gently curved and has simple hairs. Flowering time is from July to November or December.

== Taxonomy and naming ==
Verticordia etheliana was first formally described by Charles Gardner in 1942 and the description was published in the Journal of the Royal Society of Western Australia. In 1991, Alex George undertook a review of the genus Verticordia and described two varieties of V. etheliana including this one. The type collection was made by George and Elizabeth George (Berndt) near Yuna and the name formosa "is derived form the Latin formosus (well formed, handsome) in reference to the more compact, showy habit of this variety".

== Distribution and habitat ==
This variety grows in sand over hard claypan in heath and tall open shrubland between the Billabong Roadhouse and Kalbarri National Park and eastwards towards Yuna and Mullewa, in the Avon Wheatbelt, Geraldton Sandplains and Yalgoo biogeographic regions.

== Conservation ==
Verticordia etheliana var. formosa is classified as "not threatened" by the Western Australian Government Department of Parks and Wildlife.

== Use in horticulture ==
This variety has been more difficult to propagate than var. etheliana, but its low compact form, the colour of its new growth and the delicately-perfumed bright red flower clusters indicate its horticultural merit. Some plants have survived in cultivation for more than 14 years and once established, have been hardy plants. They require well-drained soil over a moisture-retaining substrate and a sunny position protected from cold winds.
