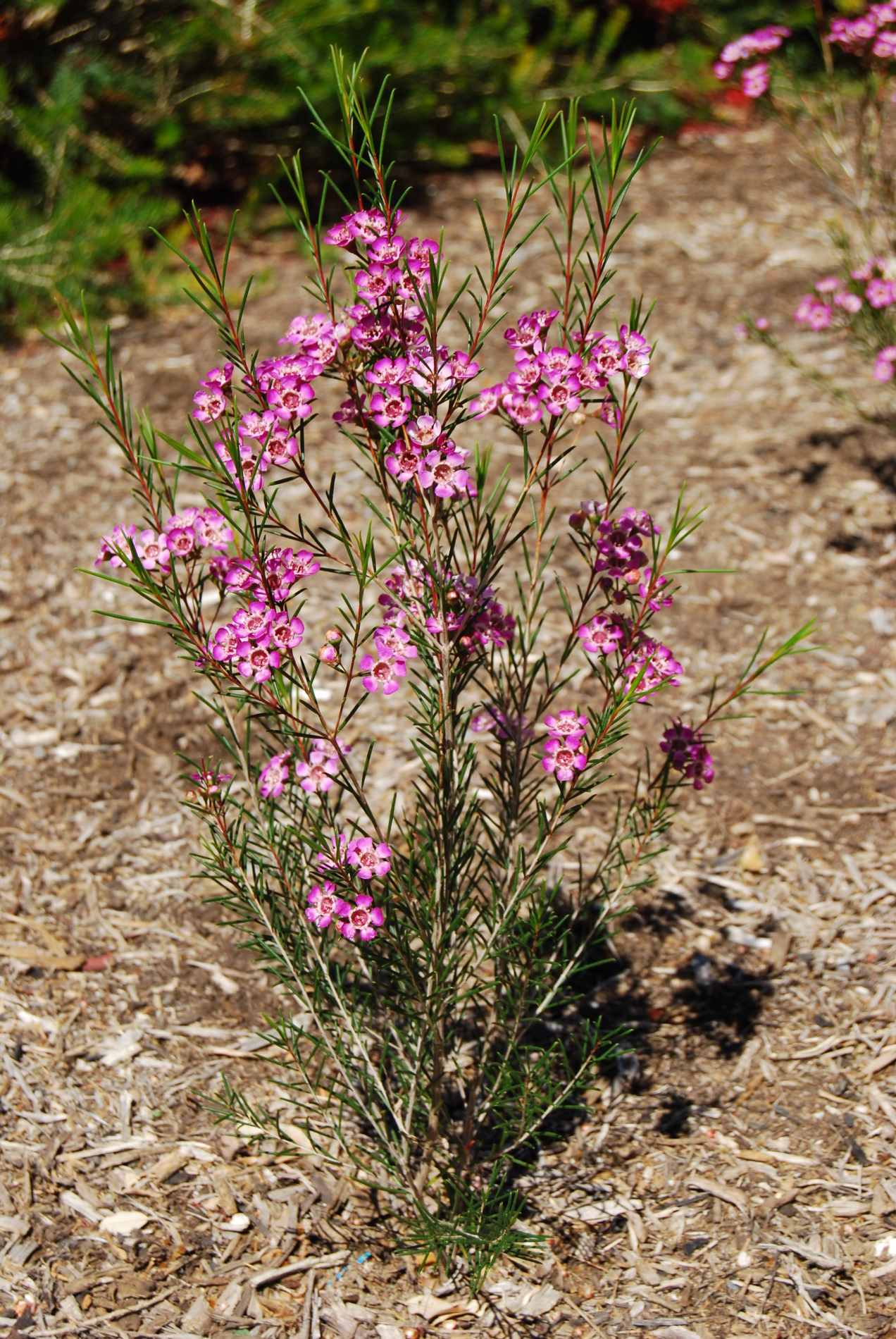

Scientific classification
- Kingdom: Plantae
- Clade: Tracheophytes
- Clade: Angiosperms
- Clade: Eudicots
- Clade: Rosids
- Order: Myrtales
- Family: Myrtaceae
- Genus: Chamelaucium
- Species: C. uncinatum

Binomial name
- Chamelaucium uncinatum Schauer

= Chamelaucium uncinatum =

Geraldton wax

Species of flowering plant

Chamelaucium uncinatum, the Geraldton waxflower, Geraldton wax, is a flowering plant endemic to Western Australia. It is an erect shrub 0.5 to 4 meters high, bearing white or pink flowers June–November. The name uncinatum means "hooked" in Latin, in reference to the tips of the leaves.

The flowers (somewhat resembling those of the tea tree) last a relatively long time after cutting, making the plant popular in horticulture. It is widely cultivated throughout Australia, both in home gardens and in the cut flower industry. Purple-flowering cultivars have been developed.

== Cultivation ==
Geraldton waxflower is relatively hardy and fairly easy to grow in a Mediterranean climate with well-drained sandy soil and a sunny aspect. It can be grown in areas of higher humidity, such as Sydney, but tends to be short lived. It is also good in pots. It has the tendency to 'fall over' and may need support. It is very drought-tolerant and has aromatic leaves.

The hardy characteristics have led to its use as a root stock species for grafting species of the closely related featherflowers of genus Verticordia.

== Varieties ==
Many varieties are commercially available, named both for colour and for early/late flowering times. In the wild, Geraldton wax is most commonly white with varying tinges of mauve. The deeper purple forms (pictured below) are selected varieties propagated commercially:

- Chamelaucium "Early Purple"
- Chamelaucium "Purple Pride"

The leaves of Geraldton wax plants can be used in a similar way to rosemary leaves in cooking, as a flavoring agent. The flavor of Geraldton wax leaves is basically citrus, comparable to lemon myrtle (another Australian native plant) or Kaffir lime. The leaves can be infused in oil to add a lemon-like flavor, or added to a stock, or sauce. It can also be used to add citrus notes to gin, or other distilled spirits.
