= List of Verticordia species =

The following is a list of Verticordia species, commonly known as featherflowers, accepted by the Australian Plant Census as at March 2026:

- Verticordia acerosa Lindl.
- Verticordia aereiflora Eliz.George & A.S.George
- Verticordia albida A.S.George
- Verticordia amphigia A.S.George – pixie ears
- Verticordia apecta Eliz.George & A.S.George – scruffy verticordia, Hay River featherflower
- Verticordia argentea A.S.George
- Verticordia attenuata A.S.George
- Verticordia aurea A.S.George - buttercups
- Verticordia auriculata A.S.George
- Verticordia bifimbriata A.S.George
- Verticordia blepharophylla A.S.George
- Verticordia brachypoda Turcz.
- Verticordia brevifolia A.S.George
- Verticordia brownii (Desf.) DC. – pink brownii, pink cauliflower
- Verticordia capillaris A.S.George – cauliflower bush
- Verticordia carinata Turcz. – pea-shaped featherflower, Stirling Range featherflower,
- Verticordia centipeda A.S.George
- Verticordia chrysantha Endl. – yellow featherflower, yellow Morrison
- Verticordia chrysanthella A.S.George – little chrysantha
- Verticordia chrysostachys Meisn.
- Verticordia citrella A.S.George
- Verticordia comosa A.S.George
- Verticordia cooloomia A.S.George - Cooloomia verticordia
- Verticordia coronata A.S.George
- Verticordia crebra A.S.George – Barrens featherflower, crowded featherflower, Twertup featherflower
- Verticordia cunninghamii Schauer – tree featherflower, liandu
- Verticordia dasystylis A.S.George
- Verticordia decussata S.T.Blake ex Byrnes
- Verticordia densiflora Lindl. – compacted featherflower
- Verticordia dichroma A.S.George
- Verticordia drummondii Schauer – Drummond's featherflower
- Verticordia elizabethiae Rye & M.D.Barrett
- Verticordia endlicheriana Schauer
- Verticordia eriocephala A.S.George – common cauliflower, lambswool, native cauliflower, wild cauliflower
- Verticordia etheliana C.A.Gardner
- Verticordia fastigiata Turcz. – mouse featherflower
- Verticordia fimbrilepis Turcz. – shy featherflower
- Verticordia forrestii F.Muell. – Forrest's featherflower
- Verticordia fragrans A.S.George – hollyhock verticordia
- Verticordia galeata A.S.George
- Verticordia gracilis A.S.George
- Verticordia grandiflora Endl. – claw featherflower, clawed featherflower, horned featherflower
- Verticordia grandis Drumm. – scarlet featherflower
- Verticordia habrantha Schauer – hidden featherflower
- Verticordia halophila A.S.George' – salt-loving featherflower, salt-loving verticordia
- Verticordia harveyi Benth. – autumn featherflower
- Verticordia helichrysantha F.Muell. ex Benth. – coast featherflower
- Verticordia helmsii S.Moore
- Verticordia huegelii Endl. – variegated featherflower
- Verticordia hughanii F.Muell. – Hughan's featherflower
- Verticordia humilis Benth. – small featherflower
- Verticordia inclusa A.S.George
- Verticordia insignis Endl.
- Verticordia integra A.S.George – plastic verticordia
- Verticordia interioris C.A.Gardner ex A.S.George
- Verticordia jamiesonii F.Muell.
- Verticordia laciniata A.S.George
- Verticordia lehmannii Schauer
- Verticordia lepidophylla F.Muell.
- Verticordia lindleyi Schauer
- Verticordia longistylis A.S.George – blue spruce verticordia
- Verticordia luteola A.S.George
- Verticordia minutiflora F.Muell.
- Verticordia mirabilis Eliz.George & A.S.George
- Verticordia mitchelliana C.A.Gardner – rapier featherflower
- Verticordia mitodes A.S.George
- Verticordia monadelpha Turcz. – pink Morrison, woolly featherflower, pink or white woolly featherflower, pink cauliflower
- Verticordia muelleriana E.Pritz.
- Verticordia multiflora Turcz.
- Verticordia nitens (Lindl.) Endl. – Christmas Morrison, glistening Morrison, Morrison, Morrison featherflower, Morrison-flower, orange Morrison, yellow Morrison, kodjeningara, kotyeningara
- Verticordia nobilis Meisn. – northern grandiflora
- Verticordia oculata Meisn.
- Verticordia ovalifolia Meisn. – oval-leaved featherflower
- Verticordia oxylepis Turcz. – bonsai featherflower
- Verticordia paludosa A.S.George
- Verticordia patens A.S.George
- Verticordia penicillaris F.Muell.
- Verticordia pennigera Endl. – native tea
- Verticordia pholidophylla F.Muell.
- Verticordia picta Endl. – china cups, painted featherflower
- Verticordia pityrhops A.S.George – east Mt Barren featherflower, pine-like featherflower, little pine verticordia
- Verticordia plumosa (Desf.) Druce – plumed featherflower, Mundijong featherflower, vasse featherflower
- Verticordia polytricha Benth. – northern cauliflower
- Verticordia pritzeliiDiels – Pritzel's featherflower
- Verticordia pulchella A.S.George
- Verticordia rennieana F.Muell. & Tate
- Verticordia roei Endl. – Roe's featherflower
- Verticordia rutilastra A.S.George – little grandiflora
- Verticordia serotina A.S.George
- Verticordia serrata (Lindl.) Schauer
- Verticordia setacea A.S.George
- Verticordia sieberi Diesing ex Schauer
- Verticordia spicata F.Muell. – spiked featherflower
- Verticordia staminosa C.A.Gardner & A.S.George
- Verticordia stenopetala Diels
- Verticordia subulata A.S.George
- Verticordia tumida A.S.George – summer featherflower
- Verticordia venusta A.S.George
- Verticordia verticillata Byrnes – tropical featherflower, whorled-leaved featherflower
- Verticordia verticordina (F.Muell.) A.S.George
- Verticordia vicinella A.S.George
- Verticordia wonganensis A.S.George
- Verticordia x eurardyensis Eliz.George & A.S.George – Eurardy magenta

== Notable revisions ==
The genus Verticordia underwent a revision by Alex George in 1991.
