= Verticordia paludosa =

Scientific classification
- Kingdom: Plantae
- Clade: Tracheophytes
- Clade: Angiosperms
- Clade: Eudicots
- Clade: Rosids
- Order: Myrtales
- Family: Myrtaceae
- Genus: Verticordia
- Subgenus: Verticordia subg. Eperephes
- Section: Verticordia sect. Verticordella
- Species: V. paludosa

Binomial name
- Verticordia paludosa A.S.George

Species of flowering plant

Verticordia paludosa is a flowering plant in the myrtle family, Myrtaceae and is endemic to the south-west of Western Australia. It is an openly branched shrub with small leaves and pink to magenta flowers with spreading, feathery sepals and erect, fringed petals in summer and autumn.

== Description ==
Verticordia paludosa is a shrub with a single main stem and a few side branches, which grows to a height of 30–90 cm (10–40 in) and 10–90 cm (4–40 in) wide. Its leaves are elliptic to egg-shaped, 2.5–3.5 mm (0.098–0.14 in) long, dished on the upper surface and covered with short hairs.

The flowers are scented and are arranged in spike-like groups, each flower on a spreading stalk 1.0–1.5 mm (0.04–0.06 in) long. Before the flower opens the bud is enclosed by two fringed bracteoles. The floral cup is top-shaped, about 2 mm (0.08 in) long, 5-ribbed and glabrous with rounded appendages which merge with the hypanthium. The sepals are 4 mm (0.2 in) long, pink to magenta-coloured and have between 6 and 7 feathery lobes. The petals are a similar colour to the sepals, 5 mm (0.2 in) long, erect, egg-shaped and with a fringe a further 1.5–2 mm (0.06–0.08 in) long. The style is 4 mm (0.16 in) long, curved and hairy near the tip. Flowering time is from December to May.

== Taxonomy and naming ==
Verticordia paludosa was first formally described by Alex George in 1991 and the description was published in Nuytsia. The specific epithet (paludosa) is a Latin word meaning "marshy" referring to the habitat where this species is often found.

George placed this species in subgenus Eperephes, section Verticordella along with V. pennigera, V. halophila, V. bifimbriata, V. lindleyi, V. blepharophylla, V. drummondii, V. wonganensis,V. mitodes, V. luteola, V. attenuata, V. tumida, V. carinata, V. centipeda, V. auriculata, V. pholidophylla, V. spicata and V. hughanii.

== Distribution and habitat ==
This verticordia grows in sand and loam in areas that are wet in winter and in sandy loam on ridges in shrubland and woodland. It occurs between Mogumber, Gillingarra, Regans Ford and the Moore River National Park in the Geraldton Sandplains, Jarrah Forest and Swan Coastal Plain biogeographic regions.

== Conservation ==
Verticordia paludosa is classified as "Priority Four" by the Western Australian Government Department of Parks and Wildlife, meaning that is rare or near threatened.

== Use in horticulture ==
Verticordia paludosa can be propagated from cuttings but these are slow to strike and the plants produced are also slow growing. The species seems to be resistant to disease but watering in hot dry weather is necessary.
