= Verticordia carinata =

Conservation status
- Vulnerable (EPBC Act)

Scientific classification
- Kingdom: Plantae
- Clade: Tracheophytes
- Clade: Angiosperms
- Clade: Eudicots
- Clade: Rosids
- Order: Myrtales
- Family: Myrtaceae
- Genus: Verticordia
- Subgenus: Verticordia subg. Eperephes
- Section: Verticordia sect. Verticordella
- Species: V. carinata

Binomial name
- Verticordia carinata Turcz.

Species of flowering plant

Verticordia carinata, commonly known as pea-shaped featherflower or Stirling Range featherflower, is a flowering plant in the myrtle family, Myrtaceae and is endemic to Western Australia. It is an erect, spindly shrub with small, well-spaced leaves and pink and red flowers. It is a rarely seen plant, not known between its description in 1849 and its rediscovery in 1990.

== Description ==
Verticordia carinata is a slender, spindly shrub which grows to a height of 0.4–1.0 m (1–3 ft) and has a single, branching stem at its base. The leaves are well spaced along the branches, elliptic to oblong in shape, dished, 3–4.5 mm (0.1–0.2 in) long and have fine, short hairs on their edges.

The flowers are scented, arranged in a double-sided spike with one flower per leaf axil, held horizontally on a stalk 5–7.5 mm (0.2–0.3 in) long. The flowers open gradually from the bottom of the spike and superficially resemble pea flowers. The floral cup is top-shaped, 2.0 mm (0.08 in) long and glabrous. The sepals are magenta to pink, fading as they age, 3.5–4.0 mm (0.14–0.16 in) long, with 5 or 6 feathery lobes. The petals are the same colour as the sepals, egg-shaped and 3.5–4.0 mm (0.14–0.16 in). The style is 6.5–7 mm (0.26–0.28 in) long, extending beyond the petals, curved with hairs near the tip. Flowering time is mainly from late November to May but flowers are often present at other times.

== Taxonomy and naming ==
Verticordia carinata was first formally described by Nikolai Turczaninow in 1849. The description was published in Bulletin de la Société impériale des naturalistes de Moscou from specimens collected by James Drummond. The specific epithet (carinata) is derived from the Latin word carinatus meaning "keeled" possibly referring to the lower two petals which, before the flower opens, resemble the keel of a pea flower.

When Alex George reviewed the genus Verticordia in 1991, he placed this species in subgenus Eperephes, section Verticordella along with V. pennigera, V. halophila, V. bifimbriata, V. lindleyi, V. blepharophylla, V. drummondii, V. wonganensis,V. paludosa, V. luteola, V. attenuata, V. tumida, V. mitodes, V. centipeda, V. auriculata, V. pholidophylla, V. spicata and V. hughanii.

== Distribution and habitat ==
This verticordia grows in sandy loam over sandstone in tall shrubland and woodland in the Stirling Range. It is not known where Drummond made the collection of the type specimen and the species was not seen again until rediscovered by a park ranger in 1990 in the Stirling Range National Park. It is only known from three populations - two in the national park and one near Trigwell in the Shire of West Arthur in the Esperance Plains and Jarrah Forest biogeographic regions.

== Conservation ==
Verticordia acerosa is classified as "Threatened Flora (Declared Rare Flora — Extant)" by the Western Australian Government Department of Parks and Wildlife and it has also been listed as "Vulnerable" (VU) under the Australian Government Environment Protection and Biodiversity Conservation Act 1999 (EPBC Act). The total number of plants has been estimated to be 260, with the main threat being grazing by kangaroos.

== Use in horticulture ==
Verticordia carinata has shown horticultural potential, having been grown in Kings Park in Perth and the Australian National Botanic Gardens in Canberra where it has shown tolerance to frost and drought. It has usually been propagated from cuttings but tissue culture has also been successful. The use of smoke water has been shown to improve the rate of germination of seeds of V. carinata.
