= Verticordia sect. Jamiesoniana =

Scientific classification
- Kingdom: Plantae
- Clade: Tracheophytes
- Clade: Angiosperms
- Clade: Eudicots
- Clade: Rosids
- Order: Myrtales
- Family: Myrtaceae
- Genus: Verticordia
- Subgenus: Verticordia subg. Eperephes
- Section: Verticordia sect. Jamiesoniana; A.S.George

Type species
- Verticordia jamiesonii F.Muell.

Group of flowering plants

Verticordia sect. Jamiesoniana is one of six sections in the subgenus Eperephes. It includes the single species Verticordia jamiesonii. Plants in this section have tiny, yellowish leaves and white flowers that turn pink as they age and have stamens and staminodes with slightly thickened hairs.

When Alex George reviewed the genus in 1991, he described the section and gave it the name Jamiesoniana after the type species V. jamiesonii named by Ferdinand von Mueller in 1883.

The type and only species in this section is Verticordia jamiesonii.
