= V. spicata =

V. spicata may refer to:

- Veronica spicata, the spiked speedwell, a plant species
- Verticordia spicata, a flowering plant species

== See also ==
- The dictionary definition of Spicata at Wiktionary
