= Verticordia elizabethiae =

Conservation status
- Priority One — Poorly Known Taxa (DEC)

Scientific classification
- Kingdom: Plantae
- Clade: Tracheophytes
- Clade: Angiosperms
- Clade: Eudicots
- Clade: Rosids
- Order: Myrtales
- Family: Myrtaceae
- Genus: Verticordia
- Subgenus: Verticordia subg. Eperephes
- Section: Verticordia sect. Verticordella
- Species: V. elizabethiae

Binomial name
- Verticordia elizabethiae Rye & M.D.Barrett

Synonyms
- Verticordia sp. Koolyanobbing (B.H.Smith 1457) WA Herbarium

Species of flowering plant

Verticordia elizabethiae, commonly known as Elizabeth's featherflower, is a species of flowering plant in the family Myrtaceae, and is endemic to the south-west of Western Australia. It is a low-growing shrub with egg-shaped leaves, the narrower end towards the base, and bright pink to purplish pink flowers and grows on the edges of salt lakes.

== Description ==
Verticordia elizabethiae is a low-growing shrub that typically grows to 0.3–0.6 m (1 ft 0 in – 2 ft 0 in) high and 0.4–1.2 m (1 ft 4 in – 3 ft 11 in) wide and lacks a lignotuber. Its leaves are more or less sessile and mostly egg-shaped with the narrower end towards the base, 1.5–2.25 mm (0.059–0.089 in) long and 1.0–1.5 mm (0.039–0.059 in) wide, usually with two rows of dark glands either side of the midvein. The flowers are 8–10 mm (0.31–0.39 in) in diameter on peduncles 0.4–0.6 mm (0.016–0.024 in) long. The floral cup and sepal lobes are deep maroon, the sepals 4–5 mm (0.16–0.20 in) long with usually five lobes and the petals are bright pink to purplish pink, 2.5–3.5 mm (0.098–0.138 in) long. There are ten stamens with pale pink filaments 1.2–1.6 mm (0.047–0.063 in) long, alternating with staminodes, and the style is curved, 3.0–4.5 mm (0.12–0.18 in) long. Flowering mainly occurs from October to December, and the fruits are about 1.5 mm (0.059 in) long and 1.6 mm (0.063 in) in diameter.

== Taxonomy ==
Verticordia elizabethiae was first formally described in 2020 by Barbara Rye and Matthew Barrett in the journal Nuytsia from specimens collected near Baladjie in 2018. The specific epithet honours the extensive contribution of Elizabeth Anne (Berndt) George, née Sykes (1935-2012) to the collection and research of verticordias. A treatment of the population had previously been published by George as an inland variant of Verticordia halophila.

This species was assigned to a Verticordia sect. Verticordella. Previously collected specimens, including one made by Charles Gardner in 1926 and another recognised as Verticordia sp. Koolyanobbing, were assigned by the authors to the new species.

== Distribution and habitat ==
Elizabeth's featherflower is only known from a near Southern Cross, Western Australia in the Avon Wheatbelt and Coolgardiebioregions of Western Australia. It occurs on flats around salt lakes amongst other halophytes forming heath communities with species of Maireana, Gunniopsis and Frankenia, associated with Callitris.

== Conservation status ==
Verticordia elizabethiae is listed as "Priority One" by the Western Australian Government Department of Biodiversity, Conservation and Attractions, meaning it is known from only a few populations which are under immediate threat from known threatening processes.
