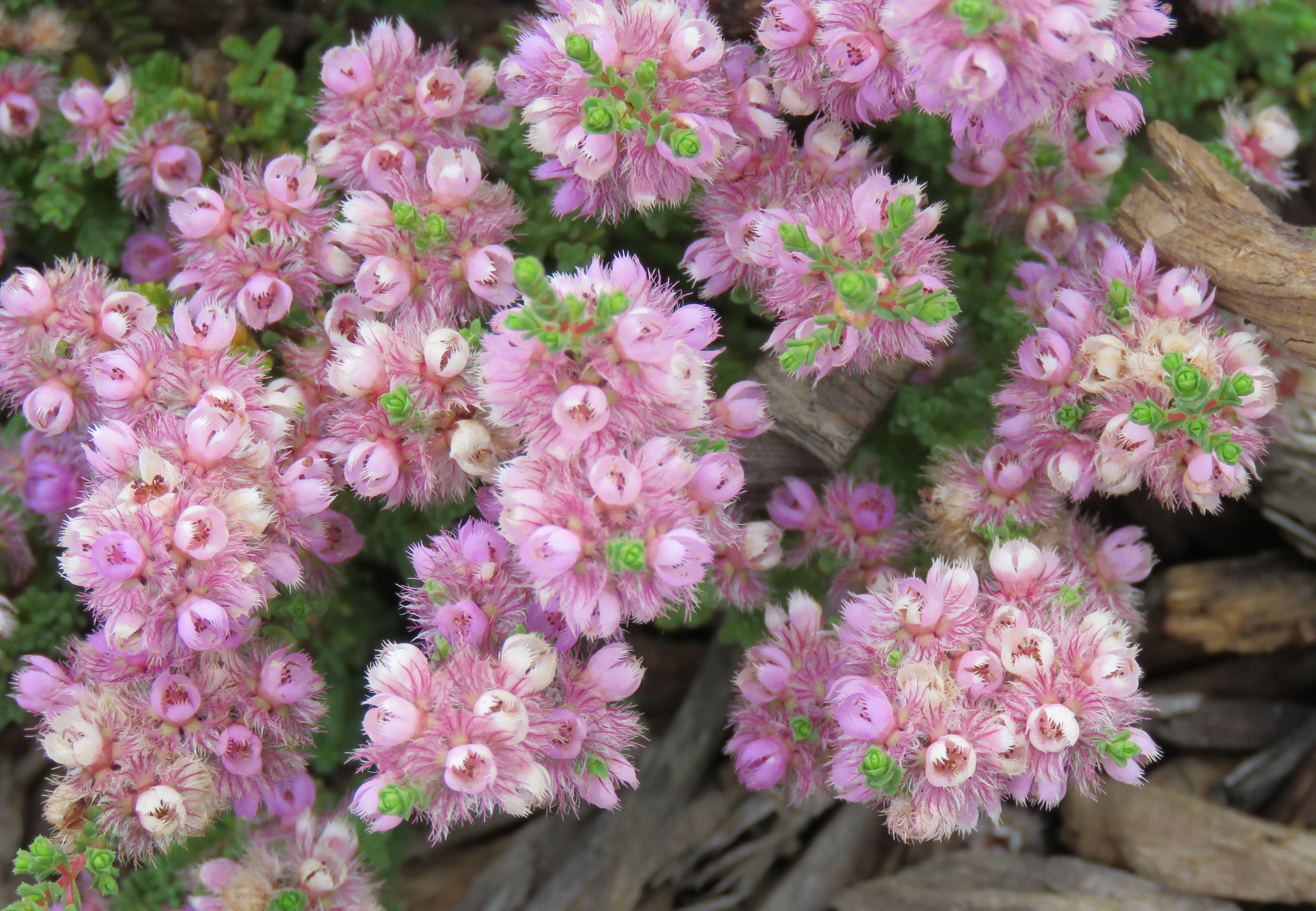
- Verticordia halophila

Scientific classification
- Kingdom: Plantae
- Clade: Tracheophytes
- Clade: Angiosperms
- Clade: Eudicots
- Clade: Rosids
- Order: Myrtales
- Family: Myrtaceae
- Genus: Verticordia
- Subgenus: Verticordia subg. Eperephes
- Section: Verticordia sect. Verticordella; Meisner

Type species
- V. drummondii

Species
- See text

= Verticordia sect. Verticordella =

Group of flowering plants

Verticordia sect. Verticordella is one of six sections in the subgenus Eperephes. It includes eighteen species in the genus Verticordia. Plants in this section are often small, bushy shrubs with a single main stem and scented flowers. (Some species have a lignotuber which will produce several stems following regrowth after fire.) The leaves are linear, usually semi-circular in cross-section and have a hairy or irregularly toothed edge. The flowers are pink, sometimes red to purple, pale yellow or white. They have a floral cup with downward curving appendages, bracteoles which are shed when the flower opens, and sepals with fringed lobes. The petals have a fringed or toothed margin and a curved style that is hairy at the apex.

In 1857, Carl Meissner proposed separating the genus Verticordia into four sections and formally described section Verticordella. The description was published in Journal of the Proceedings of the Linnean Society, Botany. When Alex George reviewed the genus in 1991, he retained Meissner's name and description of the section and included eighteen species. Meissner knew of only V. drummondii in this section and George retained this as the type species.

The type species for this section is Verticordia drummondii and the other species are V. pennigera, V. halophila, V. blepharophylla, V. lindleyi, V. carinata, V. attenuata, V. wonganensis, V. paludosa, V. luteola, V. bifimbriata, V. tumida, V. mitodes, V. centipeda, V. auriculata, V. pholidophylla, V. spicata and V. hughanii.

A revision published in 2020 recognised a variant population of Verticordia halophila as a new species, Verticordia elizabethiae, and assigned it to this section of the genus.
