= Elizabeth Anne George =

Elizabeth Anne (Berndt) George (1935–2012) was a botanical collector and writer active in Western Australia, specialising in the featherflowers Verticordia. Works include the coordination of the Verticordia Reference Collection, specimens that allowed an extensive revision of the genus by the botanist Alex George, and the standard reference Verticordia; the turner of hearts (2002).

The standard author abbreviation Eliz.George is used to indicate this person as the author when citing a botanical name.

Elizabeth George was commemorated in the naming of Verticordia elizabethiae, a species described in 2020.
