= Verticordia wonganensis =

Scientific classification
- Kingdom: Plantae
- Clade: Tracheophytes
- Clade: Angiosperms
- Clade: Eudicots
- Clade: Rosids
- Order: Myrtales
- Family: Myrtaceae
- Genus: Verticordia
- Subgenus: Verticordia subg. Eperephes
- Section: Verticordia sect. Verticordella
- Species: V. wonganensis

Binomial name
- Verticordia wonganensis A.S.George

Species of shrub

Verticordia wonganensis is a flowering plant in the myrtle family, Myrtaceae and is endemic to the south-west of Western Australia. It is a shrub which grows near Wongan Hills and has a single main stem, small leaves and spike-like groups of large, pink, feathery flowers.

== Description ==
Verticordia wonganensis is a shrub with a single main branch and which usually grows to a height of 30–70 cm (10–30 in) and up to 50 cm (20 in) wide. The leaves are arranged in decussate pairs, elliptic in shape, 1.5–2.5 mm (0.06–0.1 in) long and more or less pressed against the stem.

The flowers are scented and arranged in spike-like groups near the ends of the branches, each flower on a spreading stalk about 1 mm (0.04 in) long. The floral cup is top-shaped, about 2.5 mm (0.1 in) long, has 5 ribs and green appendages and is glabrous and slightly rough. The sepals are 5–6 mm (0.20–0.24 in) long, pink and spreading with 7 to 8 hairy lobes. The petals are bright pink, 5–6.5 mm (0.2–0.3 in) long and erect with a fringe a further 2–2.5 mm (0.08–0.1 in) long. The style is 4–5 mm (0.16–0.20 in) long, hairy and curved near the tip. Flowering time is from November to December.

== Taxonomy and naming ==
Verticordia wonganensis was first formally described by Alex George in 1991 from a specimen collected near Wongan Hills and the description was published in Nuytsia. The specific epithet (wonganensis) is derived from the name of the town, near which the species is found.

George placed this species in subgenus Eperephes, section Verticordella along with V. minutiflora and V. fastigiata.

== Distribution and habitat ==
This verticordia grows in sand in heath and shrubland. It only occurs near Wongan Hills in the Avon Wheatbelt and Geraldton Sandplains biogeographic regions.

== Conservation ==
Verticordia wonganensis is classified as "Priority Two" by the Western Australian Government Department of Parks and Wildlife, meaning that it is poorly known and known from only one or a few locations.

== Use in horticulture ==
Verticordia wonganensis is usually propagated from cuttings but these are difficult to strike and those that do are difficult to establish in gardens.
