= Verticordia subg. Eperephes =

Scientific classification
- Kingdom: Plantae
- Clade: Tracheophytes
- Clade: Angiosperms
- Clade: Eudicots
- Clade: Rosids
- Order: Myrtales
- Family: Myrtaceae
- Genus: Verticordia
- Subgenus: Verticordia subg. Eperephes; A.S.George

Sections
- See text

Subgenus of flowering plants

Verticordia subg. Eperephes is a botanical name for a grouping of similar plant species in the genus Verticordia. This subgenus contains six sections, classifying forty four species, of Alex George's infrageneric arrangement. The subgeneric name is derived from the Greek word eperephes, in reference to over-hanging parts at the hypanthium which differentiate the contained species from the other two subgenera.

Verticordia subg. Eperephes

Section Integripetala
Section Tropica

3 species, the type species for this section is Verticordia cunninghamii. These are outliers that extend the range of the genus to the Northern Territory

Section Jamiesoniana

containing a single species; Verticordia jamiesonii

Section Verticordella

containing 18 species

Section Corynatoca

containing a single species; Verticordia ovalifolia

Section Pennuligera

the lectotype chosen for this section is Verticordia grandis
