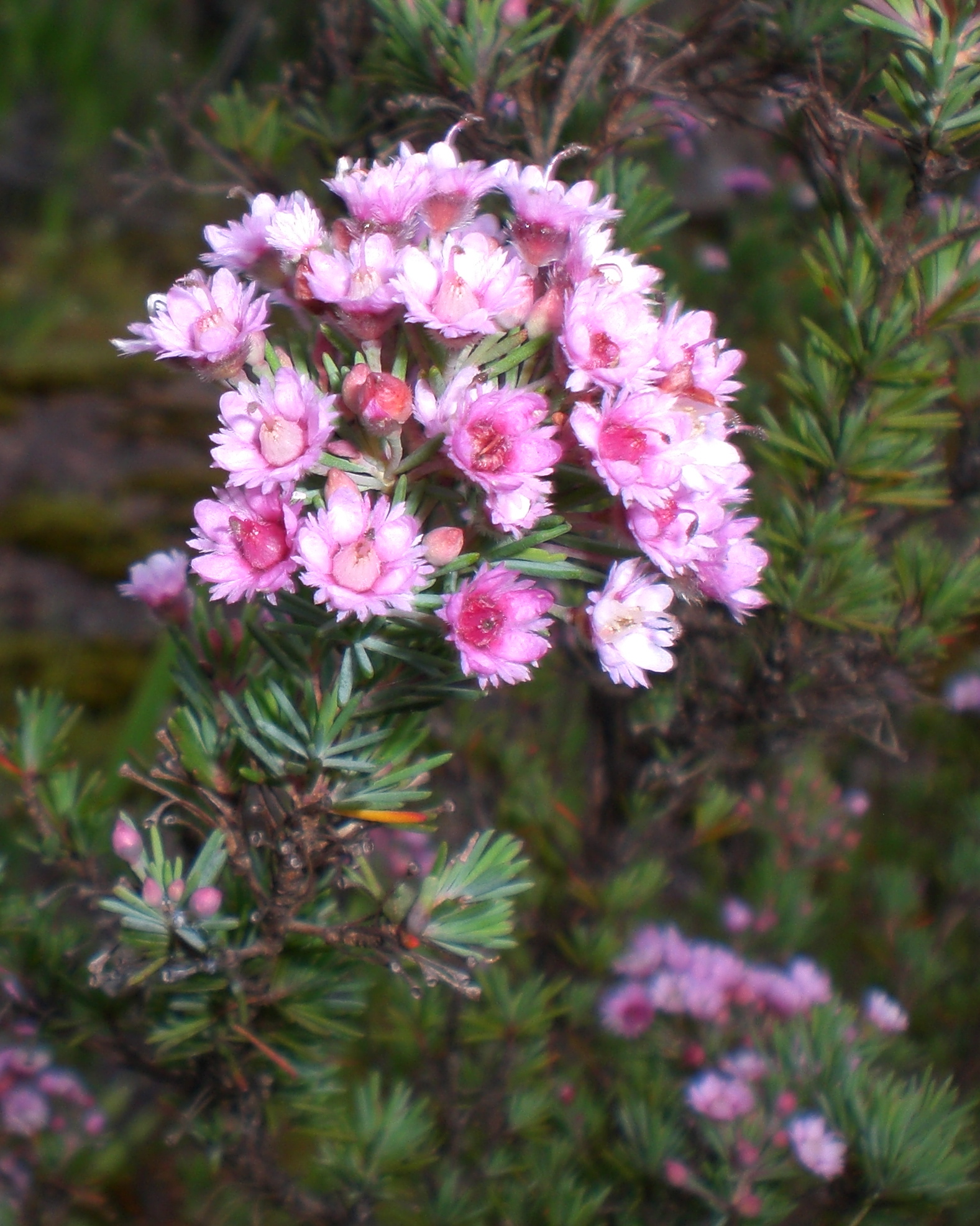
- V. plumosa growing on Mount Melville

Scientific classification
- Kingdom: Plantae
- Clade: Tracheophytes
- Clade: Angiosperms
- Clade: Eudicots
- Clade: Rosids
- Order: Myrtales
- Family: Myrtaceae
- Tribe: Chamelaucieae
- Genus: Verticordia; DC.

Species
- List of Verticordia species

= Verticordia =

Genus of flowering plants

For the clam genus, see Verticordia (bivalve).

Verticordia is a genus of more than 100 species of plants commonly known as featherflowers, in the myrtle family, Myrtaceae. They range in form from very small shrubs such as V. verticordina to trees like V. cunninghamii, some spindly, others dense and bushy, but the majority are woody shrubs up to 2.0 m (7 ft) tall. The flowers are variously described as "feathery", "woolly" or "hairy" and are found in most colours except blue. They often appear to be in rounded groups or spikes but in fact are always single, each flower borne on a separate stalk in a leaf axil. Each flower has five sepals and five petals all of a similar size with the sepals often having feathery or hairy lobes. There are usually ten stamens alternating with variously shaped staminodes. The style is simple, usually not extending beyond the petals and often has hairs near the tip. All but two species are found in Southwest Australia, the other two occurring in the Northern Territory.

The first scientific collection of verticordia specimens was made in 1791 and the first formal description of a verticordia was written in 1826 but the name Verticordia was not used until 1828. Alex George undertook a revision of the genus and in 1991 published a paper describing three subgenera, 24 sections, and 102 species.

Verticordia species occupy a wide variety of habitats, with some species widespread and abundant whilst others are rare and endangered. The profuse and striking display of intricate flowers of many species has led them to being harvested for floristry or simply admired as a wildflower.

== Description ==
The genus is best known for its flowers, often described in superlatives, which form massed displays in woodlands and heaths. These shrubs have appealed to amateur collectors and botanists, and were appreciated by the peoples of Australia before European settlement. The fringed or feathered appearance of the flowers is often enhanced by vivid and contrasting colours: this has given a common name for the genus, featherflower. The variety displayed within the species, and between species in the genera is highly diverse.

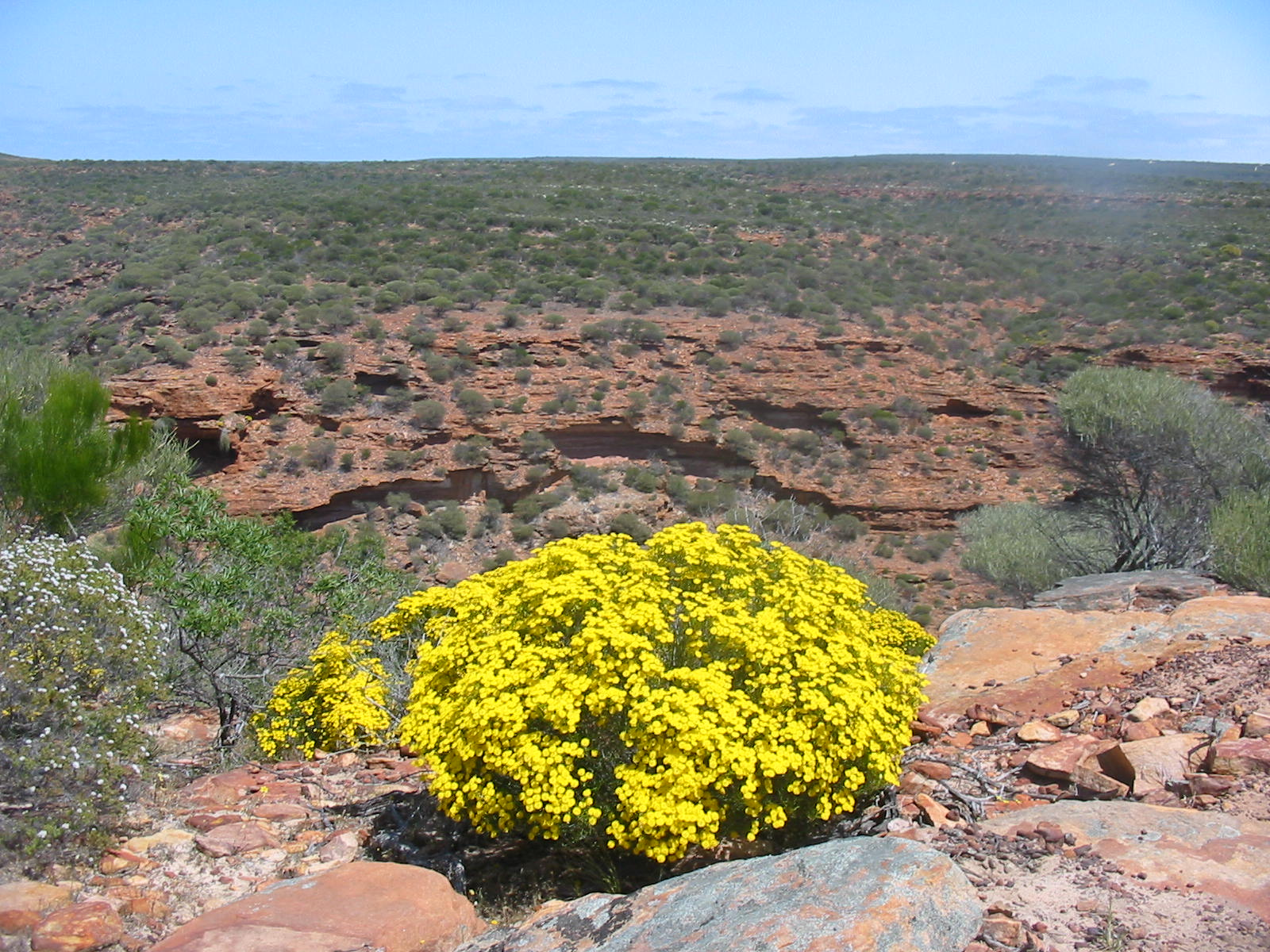
V. chrysantha in Kalbarri National Park

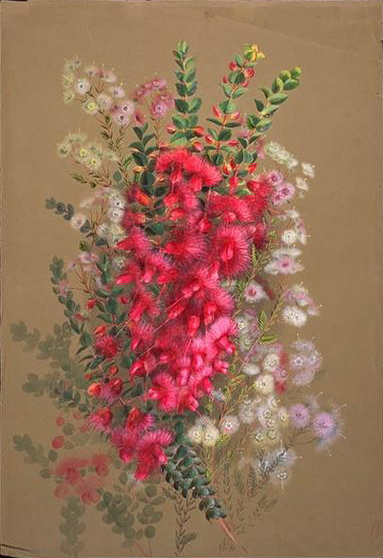
Painting by Ellis Rowan; V. grandis, V. huegelii, V. brachypoda

The genus is part of the family Myrtaceae which exist, predominantly, in the southern hemisphere. The family was highly successful in southern Jurassic Gondwana, remaining as the highly diverse tree and woody shrub genera found in Australia. Verticordia are native to Western Australia and the Northern Territory, and are closely related to Chamelaucium, Rylstonea, and Darwinia. The genus Homoranthus, found in other states of Australia, contains two species previously supposed to be Verticordia.

The single flowers are often presented erect, these may be supported individually or grouped into tight displays of various arrangements. They may appear in succession or at once. The colour often varies as the flower ages, further adding to a painterly effect. The sepals are divided into lobes, with the exception of Verticordia verticordina, in a variety of thread-like or feathery forms. The colour of the sepals and petals is highly diverse, it may be solid, or variable, or mutable.

These may be of several colours, or solid, the striking combinations are of all colours except blue. There is no unisexual flowers in the species. Different species may be growing together, their massed displays creating painterly contrasts in flowering landscapes.

They are highly variable in appearance, often as a woody shrub, low or up to 2 metres, two tropical species are 7 metres. Branches may be upright or splayed out, sometimes pendulous, and are tightly or sparsely arranged. Leaves are very small or medium, scattered or opposite, and might be ciliated at the margin. The leaf shape is highly variable across, and these may differ at the base and floral leaves on individuals.

Hybrids of different species have been recorded and identified. A variant, known as 'Eric John', appears to be an intergeneric cross between V. plumosa and Chamelaucium floriferum.

== Taxonomy ==
Archibald Menzies was the first European naturalist to make collections of verticordias. Menzies sailed on HMS Discovery during the Vancouver Expedition and made his collections in October 1791 near King George Sound, but these specimens would remain undescribed for 35 years.

The first formal description of a plant now known as a verticordia was by René Desfontaines in 1826. Desfontaines described a specimen which Robert Brown had collected at Lucky Bay in January 1802. Brown had been engaged as naturalist aboard HMS Investigator led by Matthew Flinders. The specimen was given the name Chamaelaucium brownii, in honour of Brown.

The first formal description of the genus Verticordia was written in 1828 by Augustin de Candolle and published in his Prodromus Systematis Naturalis Regni Vegetabilis. De Candolle transferred Chamelaucium brownii (as Verticordia brownii) and Chamelaucium fontanesii (now known as Verticordia plumosa) to the new genus but did not nominate a type species or provide an etymology for the name. It is possible that the type for Chamelaucium fontanesii was collected by Archibald Menzies in 1791 but collections of this species had also been made by Leschenault in 1803. The derivation of the name Verticordia was not explained by de Candolle, but it has generally been taken as a reference to the epithet of the ancient Roman goddess Venus. Venus's sacred flower was the myrtle, of a plant in same family (Myrtaceae) as Verticordia. The name Verticordia, literally translated, means 'turner of hearts'.

Other early additions to the genus were V. cunninghamii named in 1843 by Johannes Schauer for a collection made by Allan Cunningham, and V. huegelii and V. insignis collected by Charles von Hügel and described by Stephan Endlicher in 1837. The German botanist Ludwig Preiss collected more than 2,000 species of plants whilst living in Western Australia, including those named V. endlicheriana, V. habrantha and V. lehmannii by Schauer in 1843.

In 1991, Alex George undertook a review of the genus and described 84 new species, subspecies, and varieties. All were grouped into three subgenera and twenty-four sections. His infrageneric classification was supported by a study of chromosome number in Verticordia and of barriers to hybridisation.

In 2010, George described a new species, V. setacea and new subspecies of V. mitchelliana.

At present, the subgenera are Chrysoma with seven sections and twenty-one species, subgenus Verticordia with eleven sections and thirty-six species, and subgenus Eperephes with six sections and forty-four species.

== Distribution and habitat ==
Verticordia occur naturally in woodlands, sandy heaths and on granite outcrops. The mediterranean climate, sandy soils of the Southwest of the state, is where the greatest number of Verticordia species are found.

== Use in horticulture ==
Verticordia are known for their feather-like or fringed flowers, the beauty of these is invariably included in any description. This has been accompanied by a high desirability as a garden plant, and as a cut flower. Restrictions exist on the collection of wildflowers in Western Australia, but previous collection of flowers for the floral industry is thought to have placed some species under duress.

They are generally somewhat difficult to grow in cultivation, but some success has been achieved. The most reliable species is V. Plumosa, the Plumed Featherflower, but many other species are found in highly specialised habitat. Outside of their natural habitat Verticordia have shown consistently good results in the temperate regions of Australia. All species require excellent drainage and prefer Mediterranean-type climate of very dry summers and wet winters.

The cultivation of Verticordia in the Eastern states of Australia has proved difficult; many of the species are intolerant of the wet summers of those regions, especially with regard to root or collar rot and moulds and mildew. The successes achieved by some growers have been through the use of bell jars, attention to soil types and potting mixes, and, experimentally, the use of grafting onto plants of related genera, such as Darwinia citriodora and Geraldton Wax, Chamelaucium uncinatum.

== See also ==
- List of Verticordia species
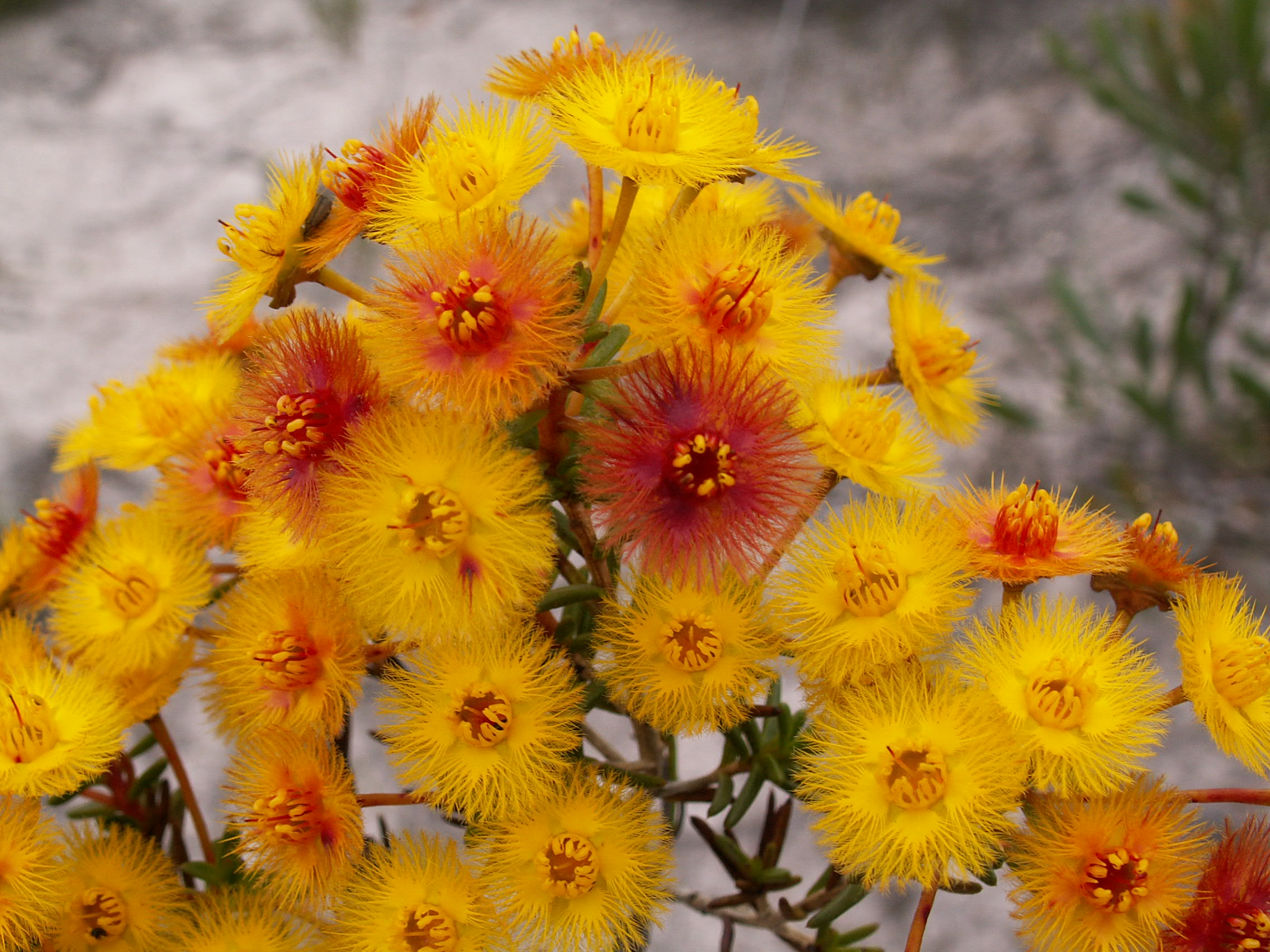
V. endlicheriana near Mount Lesueur

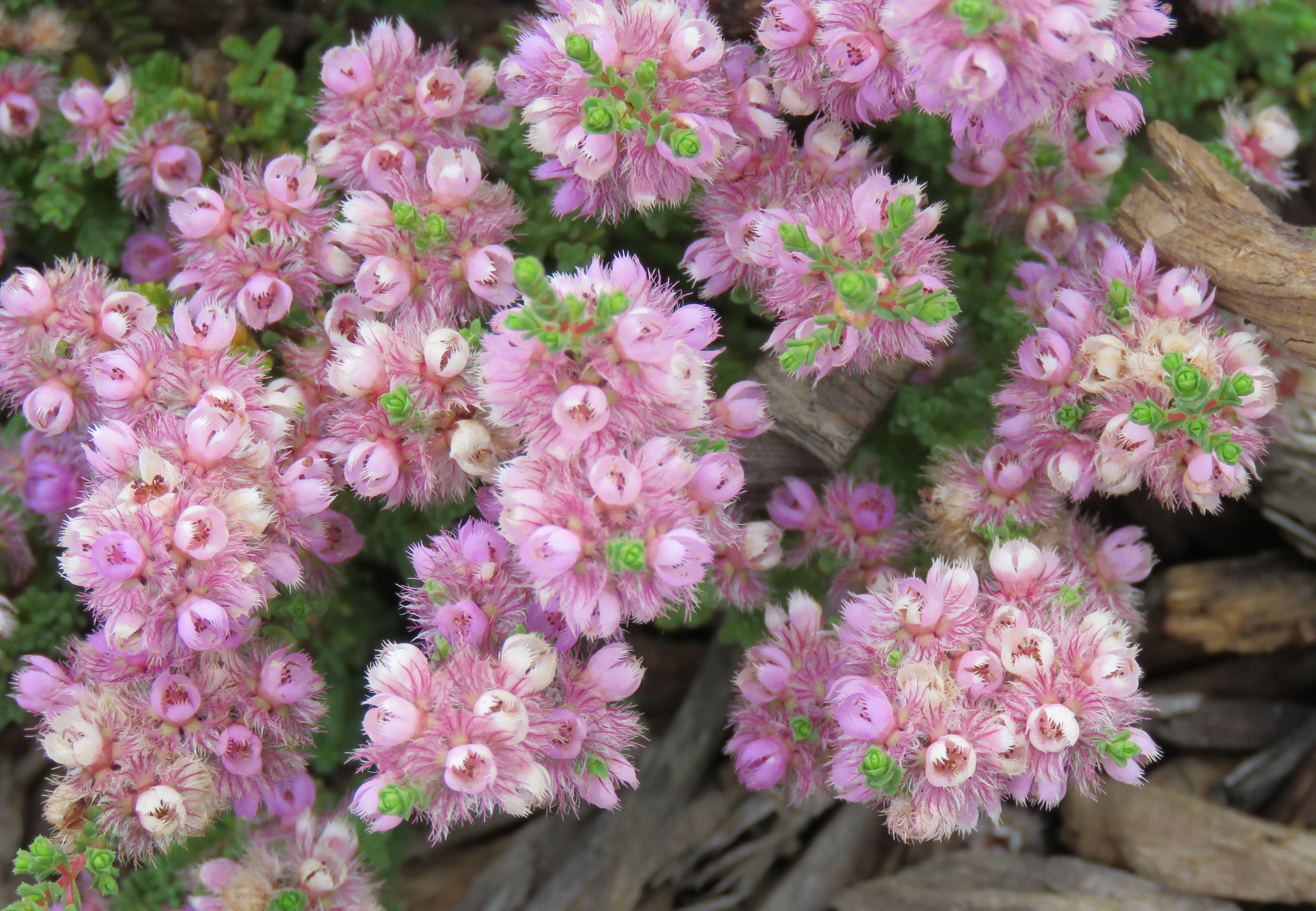
V. halophila in the Royal Botanic Gardens, Cranbourne

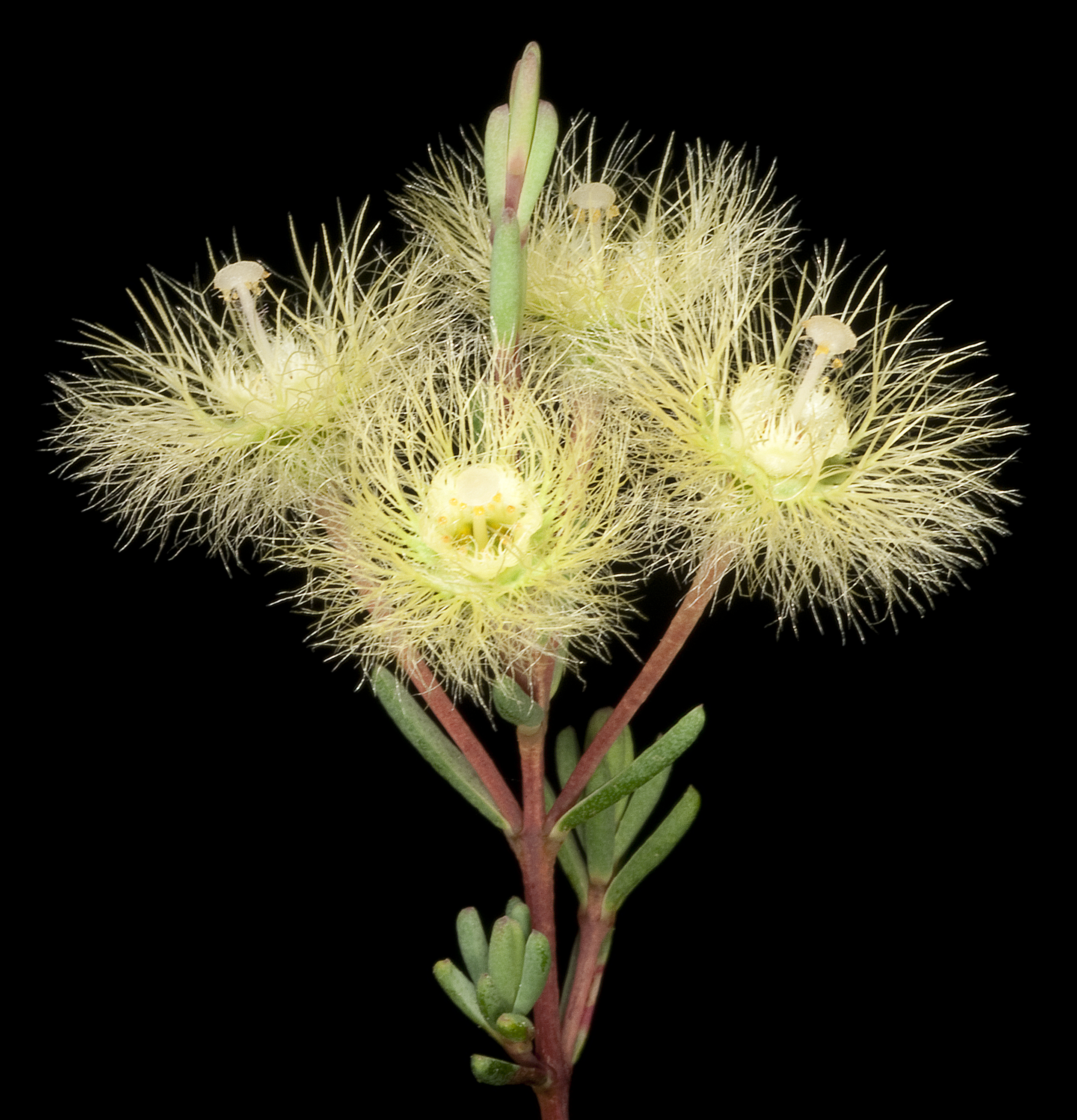
V. heugelii

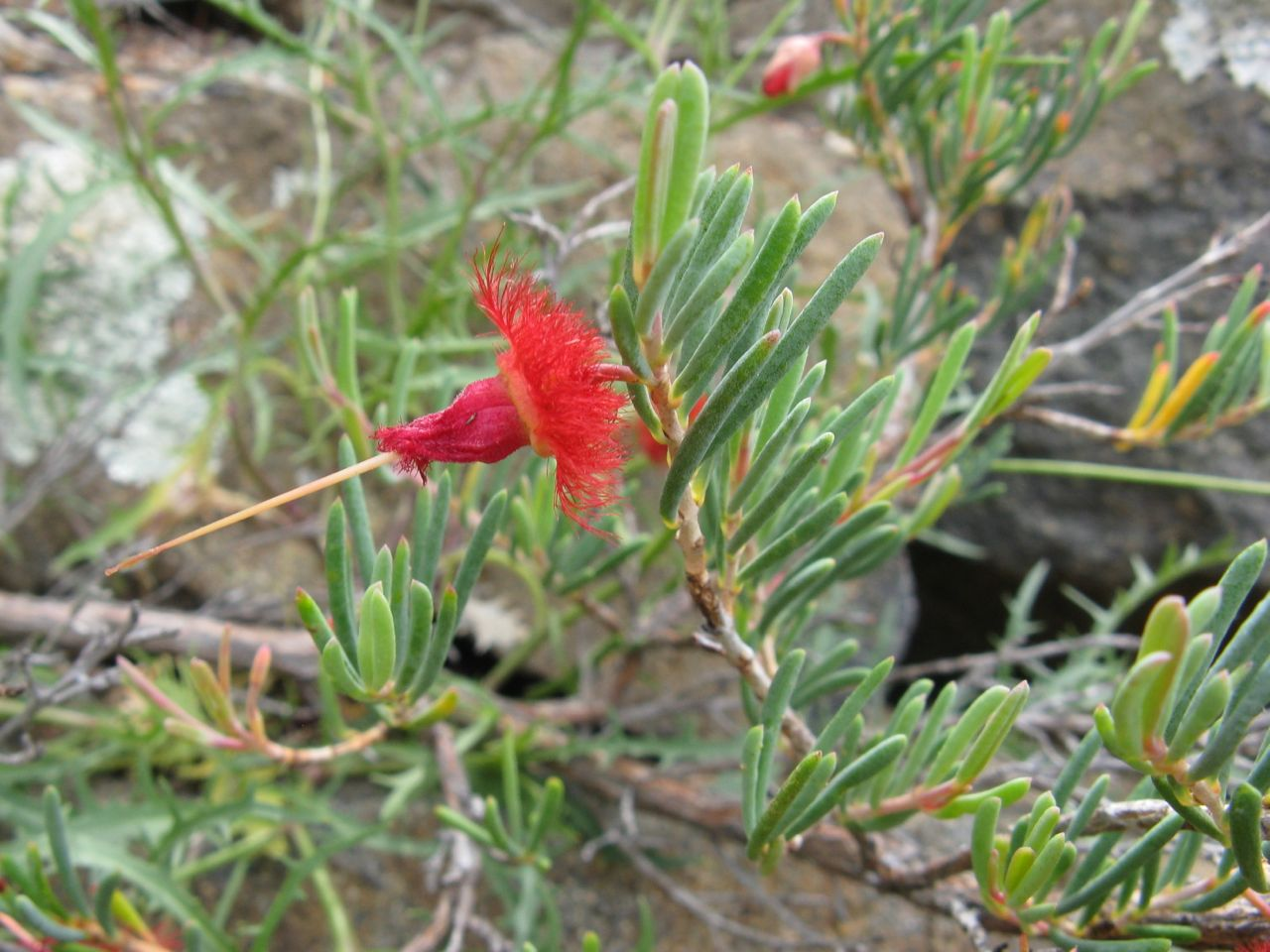
V. mitchelliana, in Australian National Botanic Gardens

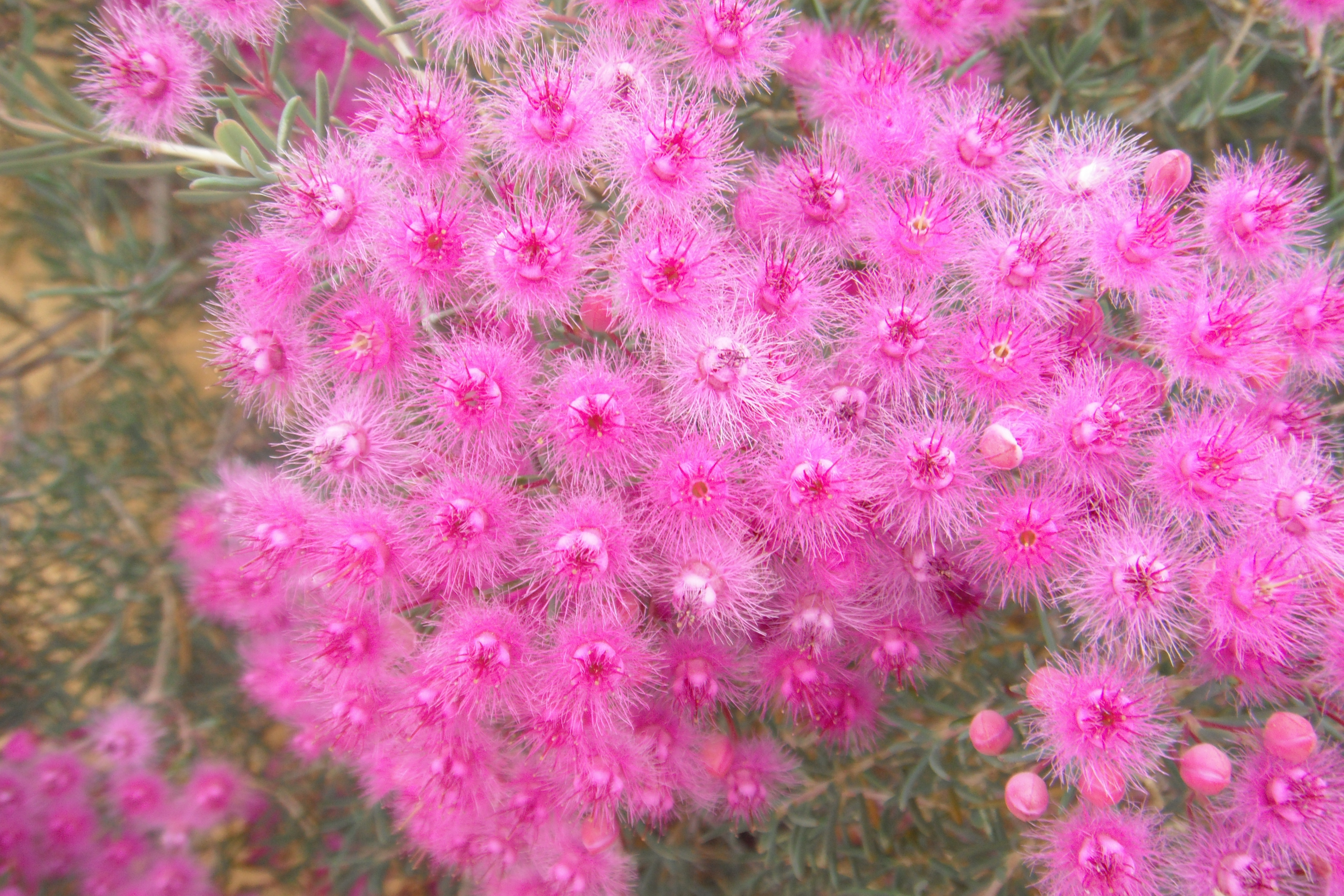
V. monadelpha

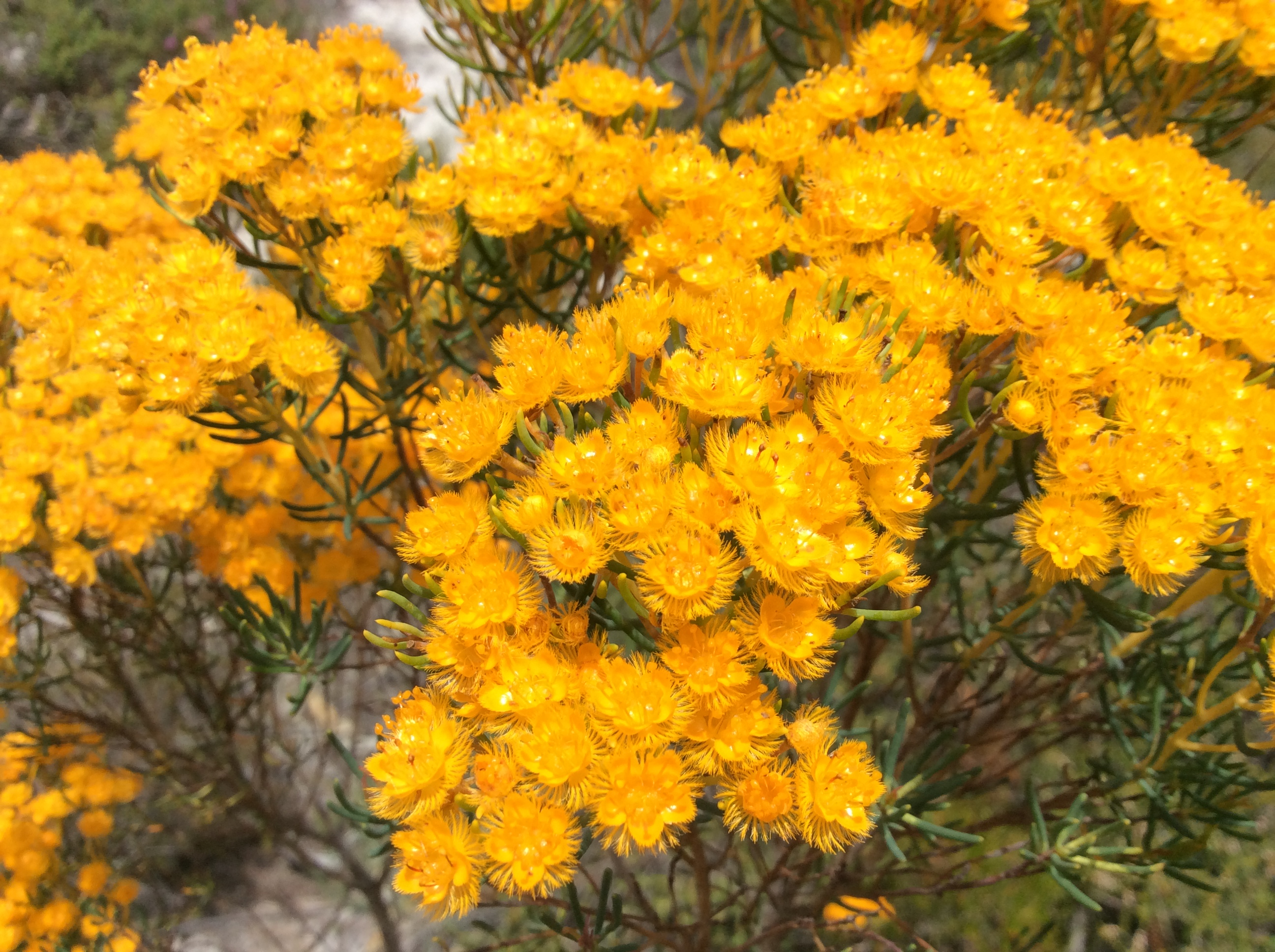
V. nitens near Gingin

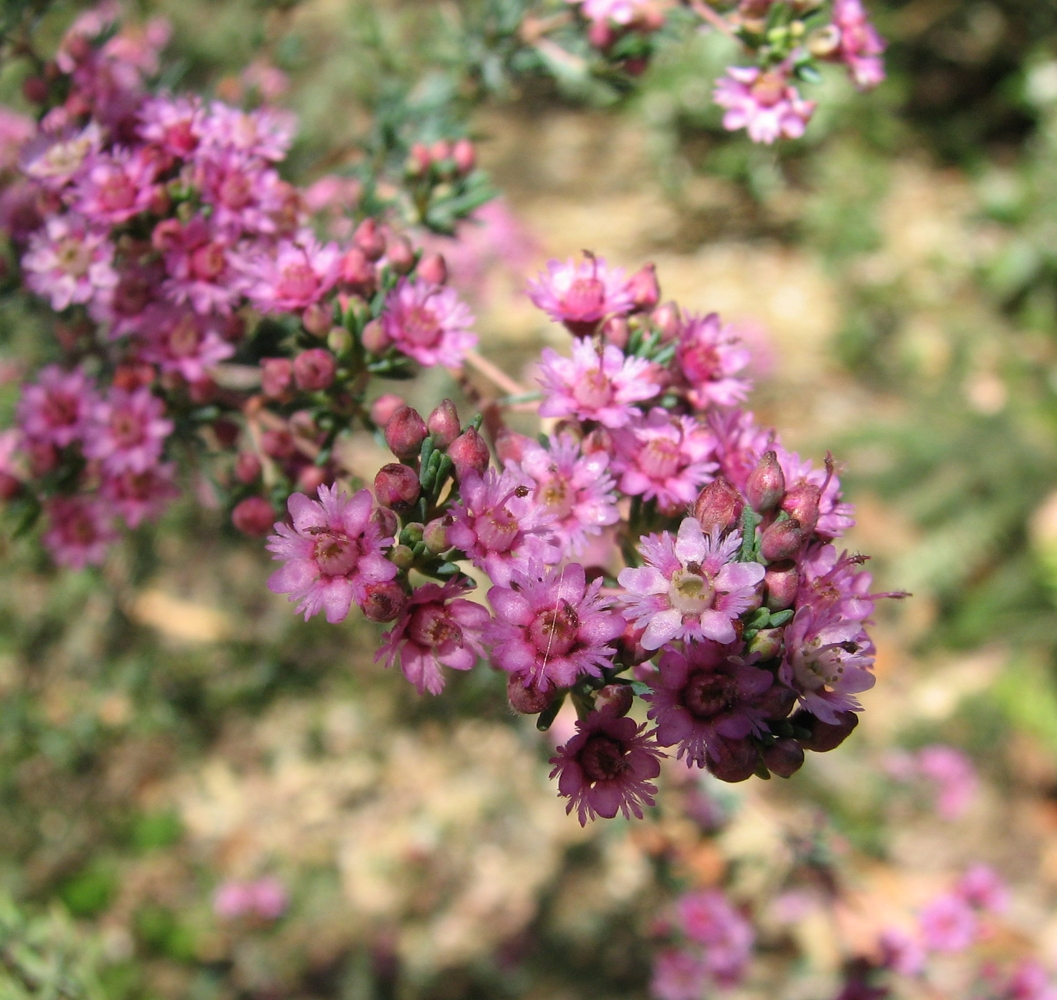
V. plumosa, in Maranoa Gardens
