= Leioproctus ruficornis =

Scientific classification
- Kingdom: Animalia
- Phylum: Arthropoda
- Clade: Pancrustacea
- Class: Insecta
- Order: Hymenoptera
- Family: Colletidae
- Genus: Leioproctus
- Species: L. ruficornis

Binomial name
- Leioproctus ruficornis (Smith, 1879)

Synonyms
- Lamprocolletes ruficornis Smith, 1879; Paracolletes velutinus Cockerell, 1929

Species of bee

Leioproctus ruficornis, or Leioproctus (Zosterocolletes) ruficornis, is a species of bee in the family Colletidae and subfamily Colletinae. It is endemic to Australia. It was described by English entomologist Frederick Smith in 1879.

== Distribution and habitat ==
The species occurs in southern Australia. Type localities include Eradu, Western Australia.

== Behaviour ==
The adults are flying mellivores. Flowering plants visited by the bees include Verticordia serrata and Boronia capitata.

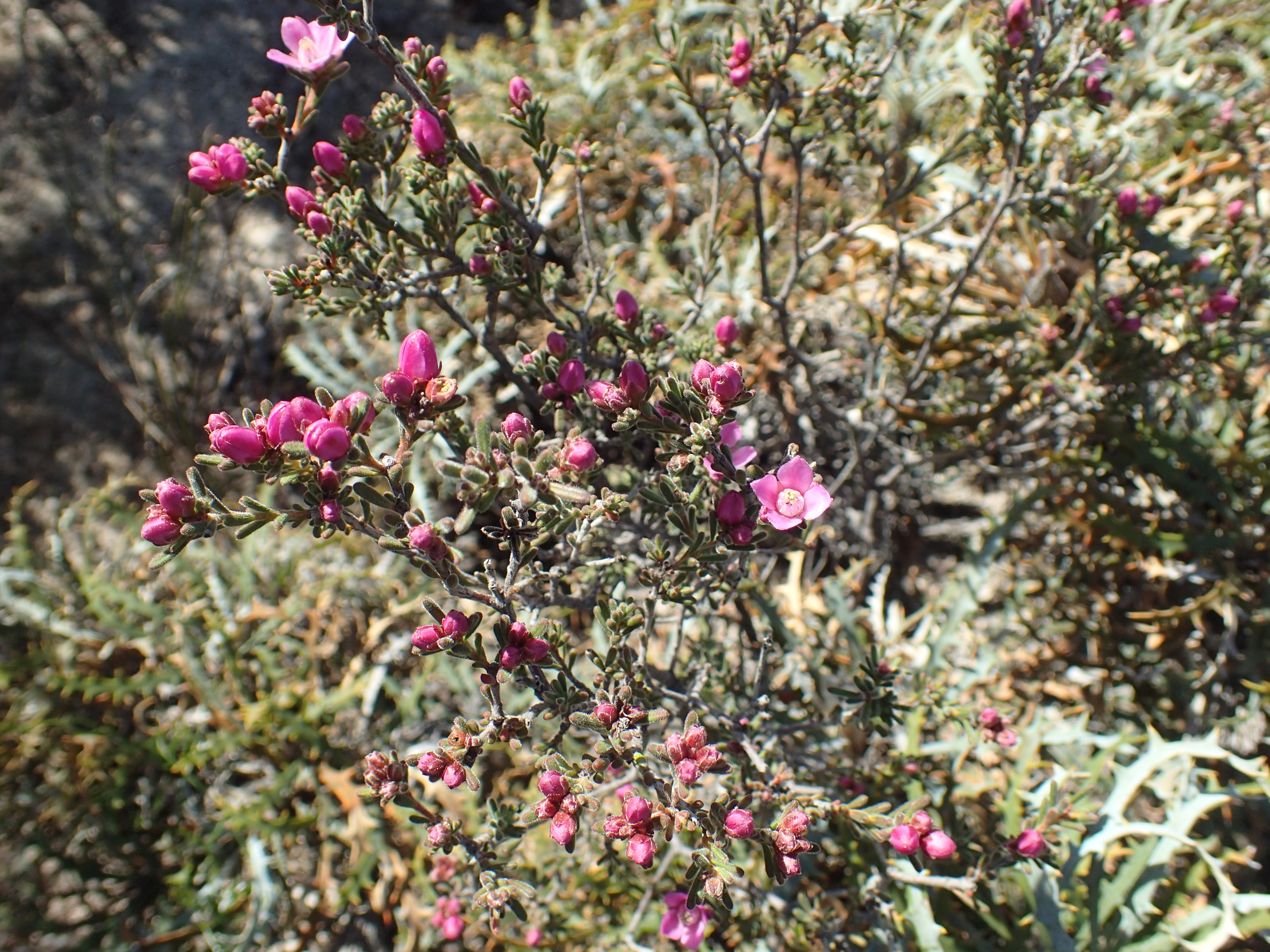
Boronia capitata (cluster boronia), a forage plant of the bees
