= Verticordia amphigia =

Conservation status
- Priority Three — Poorly Known Taxa (DEC)

Scientific classification
- Kingdom: Plantae
- Clade: Tracheophytes
- Clade: Angiosperms
- Clade: Eudicots
- Clade: Rosids
- Order: Myrtales
- Family: Myrtaceae
- Genus: Verticordia
- Subgenus: Verticordia subg. Chrysoma
- Section: Verticordia sect. Jugata
- Species: V. amphigia

Binomial name
- Verticordia amphigia A.S.George

Species of flowering plant

Verticordia amphigia commonly known as pixie ears is a flowering plant in the myrtle family, Myrtaceae and is endemic to the south-west of Western Australia. It is usually an open, much-branched shrub with narrow leaves and yellow flowers which sometimes produce a "sea" of colour in the wild. The flowers are surrounded by boat-shaped bracteoles which give the plant both its common and scientific names.

== Description ==
Verticordia amphigia is a shrub which grows to a height of 1.3 m (4 ft), a width of 1 m (3 ft) and has one or several main stems with a number of branches. The leaves are linear to narrow lance-shaped, concave to almost circular in cross-section, 5–8 mm (0.2–0.3 in) long and have a pointed end.

The flowers are scented, in rounded groups on erect stems 7–15 mm (0.3–0.6 in) long. Persistent, boat-shaped bracteoles with short hairs on their rim surround the flower. The sepals are yellow, about 2 mm (0.08 in) long, spread widely with 5 to 7 lobes covered with fine hairs. The petals are yellow, becoming red with age, 2.5 mm (0.1 in) long with spreading, finger-like projections. The style is about 3.5 mm (0.1 in) long, straight and glabrous. Flowering time is from October to November.

== Taxonomy and naming ==
The species was first formally described by Alex George in 1991 and the description was published in Nuytsia from specimens collected south of Cockleshell Gully near Jurien Bay. The specific epithet (amphigia) is derived from the Ancient Greek word ἀμφίγυος (amphigyos) meaning "pointed at both ends" referring to the boat-shaped bracteoles.

George placed this species in subgenus Chrysoma, section Jugata along with V. chrysanthella, V. chrysantha, V. galeata, V. brevifolia, V. coronata, and V. laciniata.

== Distribution and habitat ==
This verticordia grows in sand, often in association with Melaleuca rhaphiophylla and Banksia prionotes, between Cockleshell Gully and Eneabba in the Geraldton Sandplains and Swan Coastal Plain biogeographic regions.

== Conservation ==
Verticordia amphigia is classified as "Priority Three" by the Western Australian Government Department of Parks and Wildlife, meaning that it is poorly known and known from only a few locations but is not under imminent threat.

== Use in horticulture ==
Wild populations of this verticordia often produce a massed display of yellow flowers on red stems, indicating that the species has horticultural potential. The dried flowers retain their colour and might in future be grown commercially for the cut flower trade. Cuttings from wild plants have proven very difficult to strike but those taken from cultivated specimens have a much higher strike rate. Other methods of propagation have not as yet been trialled.
