= Verticordia brevifolia =

Scientific classification
- Kingdom: Plantae
- Clade: Tracheophytes
- Clade: Angiosperms
- Clade: Eudicots
- Clade: Rosids
- Order: Myrtales
- Family: Myrtaceae
- Genus: Verticordia
- Subgenus: Verticordia subg. Chrysoma
- Section: Verticordia sect. Jugata
- Species: V. brevifolia

Binomial name
- Verticordia brevifolia A.S.George

Species of flowering plant

Verticordia brevifolia is a flowering plant in the myrtle family, Myrtaceae and is endemic to the south-west of Western Australia. It is a small shrub with shortly cylindrical leaves and bright yellow flowers which turn red as they age. There are two subspecies, both of which have limited distributions and a priority conservation rating.

== Description ==
Verticordia brevifolia is a shrub which grows to a height of 20–40 cm (8–20 in) and which usually has more than one main stem at its base. Its leaves are linear in shape, circular in cross-section, 3–7 mm (0.1–0.3 in) long, mostly crowded on short upper branches and have a short, sometimes hooked point on their end.

The flowers are usually scented and arranged in rounded groups near the ends of the branches, each flower on an erect stalk 7–15 mm (0.3–0.6 in) long. The floral cup is shaped like half a sphere, about 1.5 mm (0.06 in) long and has a slightly warty surface. The sepals are bright yellow fading to red, 3.5 mm (0.1 in) long, with 6 or 7 feathery lobes. The petals are also bright yellow, 3–5 mm (0.1–0.2 in), with long, spreading, finger-like projections. The style is straight, 1.5–3.5 mm (0.06–0.1 in) long, and glabrous. Flowering time is from September to November.

== Taxonomy and naming ==
Verticordia brevifolia was first formally described by Alex George in 1991 and the description was published in Nuytsia from specimens collected near Nyabing by Alex and Elizabeth George. The specific epithet (brevifolia) is derived from the Latin words brevis meaning "short" and folium meaning "leaf".

There are two subspecies:

- Verticordia brevifolia A.S.George subsp. brevifolia which has sepals and petals 3–3.5 mm (0.12–0.14 in) long and occurs in the Nyabing area;
- Verticordia brevifolia subsp. stirlingensis A.S.George which has sepals and petals 4–5 mm (0.16–0.20 in) long and is only found in the Stirling Range area.

George placed this species in subgenus Chrysoma, section Jugata along with V. chrysanthella, V. chrysantha, V. galeata, V. coronata, V. amphigia and V. laciniata.

== Distribution and habitat ==
All the known populations of subspecies brevifolia occur in gravelly clay on roadsides between Nyabing, Dumbleyung and Ongerup in the Avon Wheatbelt, Jarrah Forest and Mallee biogeographic regions. Subspecies stirlingensis is mostly only found in the Stirling Range National Park in the Esperance Plains and Mallee biogeographic regions where it grows in gravel, sand or loam in heath, shrubland or woodland.

== Conservation ==
Subspecies brevifolia is classified as "Priority Three" by the Western Australian Government Department of Parks and Wildlife because all the known populations occur on roadsides. Subspecies stirlingensis is classified as Priority Two because there are only a few known populations of this plant.

== Use in horticulture ==
Subspecies brevifolia has proven to be easier to propagate and grow than stirlingensis and has been cultivated for more than eight years where it is a small shrub with brightly coloured flowers. Propagation from cuttings is usual, and the plants are tolerant of light frosts.
