= Verticordia sect. Synandra =

Scientific classification
- Kingdom: Plantae
- Clade: Tracheophytes
- Clade: Angiosperms
- Clade: Eudicots
- Clade: Rosids
- Order: Myrtales
- Family: Myrtaceae
- Genus: Verticordia
- Subgenus: Verticordia subg. Chrysoma
- Section: Verticordia sect. Synandra; A.S.George

Type species
- Verticordia staminosa

Group of flowering plants

Verticordia sect. Synandra is a section that describes a single species in the genus Verticordia. The section is one of seven in the subgenus, Verticordia subg. Chrysoma. The characteristics of this section includes having branches and flower stalks which are covered with stiff, bristly hairs, and stamens and staminodes which are joined at their base in a tube. The subspecies and varieties of the single species in this section all have bright green leaves and superficially resemble dwarf pine trees.

When Alex George reviewed the genus in 1991, he described the section and gave it the name Synandra after the Ancient Greek prefix syn- meaning "together" and -andros meaning "male" in reference to the joined stamens and staminodes.

The type and only species in this section is Verticordia staminosa.
