= Verticordia sect. Jugata =

Scientific classification
- Kingdom: Plantae
- Clade: Tracheophytes
- Clade: Angiosperms
- Clade: Eudicots
- Clade: Rosids
- Order: Myrtales
- Family: Myrtaceae
- Genus: Verticordia
- Subgenus: Verticordia subg. Chrysoma
- Section: Verticordia sect. Jugata

Type species
- Verticordia chrysantha

Species
- 7 species: see text.

Group of flowering plants

Verticordia sect. Jugata is one of seven sections in the subgenus Chrysoma. It includes seven species of plants in the genus Verticordia. Plants in this section are mostly bushy shrubs to 1.0 m (3 ft) tall with bright yellow flowers which in some species turn red as they age. They have sepals with fringed lobes, petals which have lobes arranged like the fingers of a hand and bracteoles which are joined together and remain attached to the flower after it opens. When Alex George reviewed the genus in 1991, he described the section and gave it the name Jugata. The name Jugata is from the Latin word jugis meaning "yoked together" referring to the arrangement of the bracteoles in these species.

The type species for this section is Verticordia chrysantha and the other six species are V. chrysanthella, V. galeata, V. brevifolia V. coronata, V. amphigia and V. laciniata.
