= Verticordia sect. Unguiculata =

Scientific classification
- Kingdom: Plantae
- Clade: Tracheophytes
- Clade: Angiosperms
- Clade: Eudicots
- Clade: Rosids
- Order: Myrtales
- Family: Myrtaceae
- Genus: Verticordia
- Subgenus: Verticordia subg. Chrysoma
- Section: Verticordia sect. Unguiculata

Type species
- Verticordia grandiflora

Species
- 7 species: see text.

Group of flowering plants

Verticordia sect. Unguiculata is one of seven sections in the subgenus Chrysoma. It includes three species of plants in the genus Verticordia. Plants in this section are rigid shrubs with a single main stem and are less than 1.0 m (3 ft) tall. They have yellow flowers arranged in corymb-like groups and the flowers turn red as they age. They have sepals with fringed lobes, petals which have lobes arranged like the fingers of a hand and anthers which have an appendage which looks like a pair of claws. When Alex George reviewed the genus in 1991, he described the section and gave it the name Unguiculata. The name Unguiculata is the diminutive form of the Latin word unguis meaning "little claw" or "little talon" referring to the anther appendage in these species.

The type species for this section is Verticordia grandiflora and the other two species are V. nobilis and V. rutilastra.
