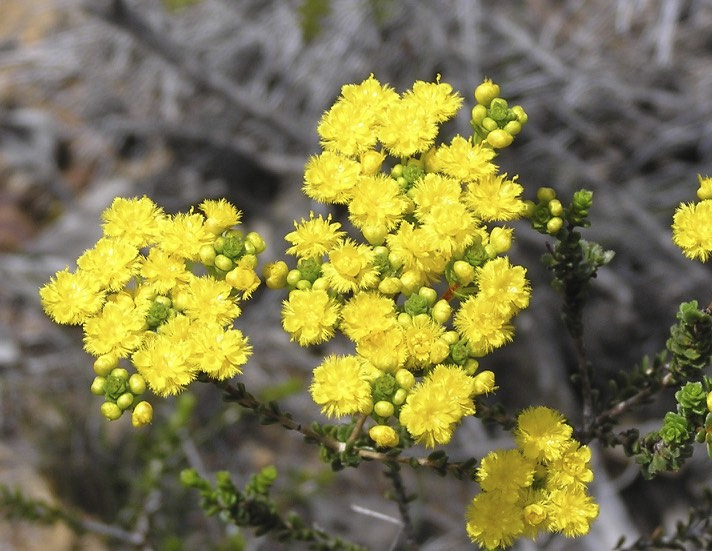

Scientific classification
- Kingdom: Plantae
- Clade: Tracheophytes
- Clade: Angiosperms
- Clade: Eudicots
- Clade: Rosids
- Order: Myrtales
- Family: Myrtaceae
- Genus: Verticordia
- Subgenus: Verticordia subg. Chrysoma
- Section: Verticordia sect. Sigalantha

Type species
- Verticordia serrata

Species
- 2 species: see text.

= Verticordia sect. Sigalantha =

Group of flowering plants

Verticordia sect. Sigalantha is one of seven sections in the subgenus Chrysoma. It includes two species of plants in the genus Verticordia. Plants in this section are rigid shrubs with a single main stem and are up to 1.0 m (3 ft) tall. They have golden-yellow flowers with prominent shining petals. The flowers are arranged in corymb-like groups and become pale or grey as they age. The bracteoles fall off the flower as it opens. When Alex George reviewed the genus in 1991, he described the section and gave it the name Sigalantha. The name Sigalantha is derived from the Ancient Greek words sigaloeis 'shiny' and anthos 'flower', referring to the shiny petals of these species.

The type species for this section is Verticordia serrata and the other species is V. integra.
