= Verticordia sect. Cooloomia =

Scientific classification
- Kingdom: Plantae
- Clade: Tracheophytes
- Clade: Angiosperms
- Clade: Eudicots
- Clade: Rosids
- Order: Myrtales
- Family: Myrtaceae
- Genus: Verticordia
- Subgenus: Verticordia subg. Chrysoma
- Section: Verticordia sect. Cooloomia; A.S.George

Type species
- Verticordia cooloomia

Group of flowering plants

Verticordia sect. Cooloomia is a section that describes a single species in the flowering plant genus Verticordia. The section is one of seven in the subgenus, Verticordia subg. Chrysoma. The characteristics of this section includes leaves that differ in shape, depending on their position on the plant and very small sepals. In most other respects, the one plant in this section is similar to those in section Verticordia sect. Chrysoma.

When Alex George reviewed the genus in 1991, he described the section and gave it the name Cooloomia after Verticordia cooloomia, the only species it contains.
