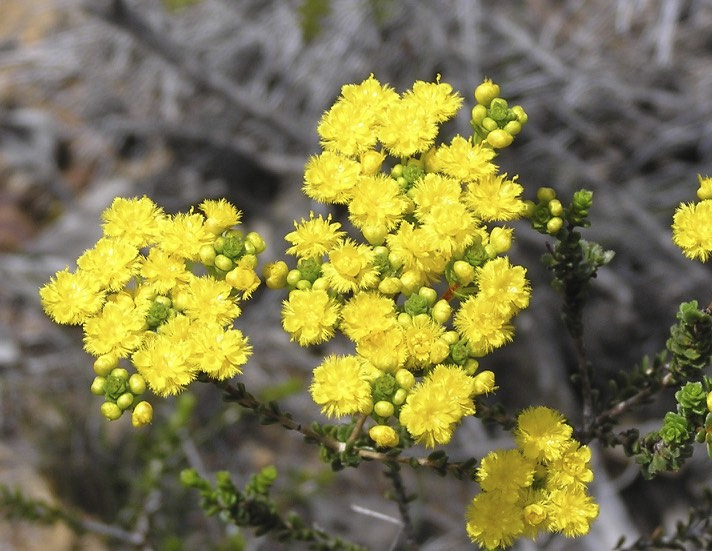
- Verticordia serrata growing in the Boyagin Nature Reserve near Pingelly
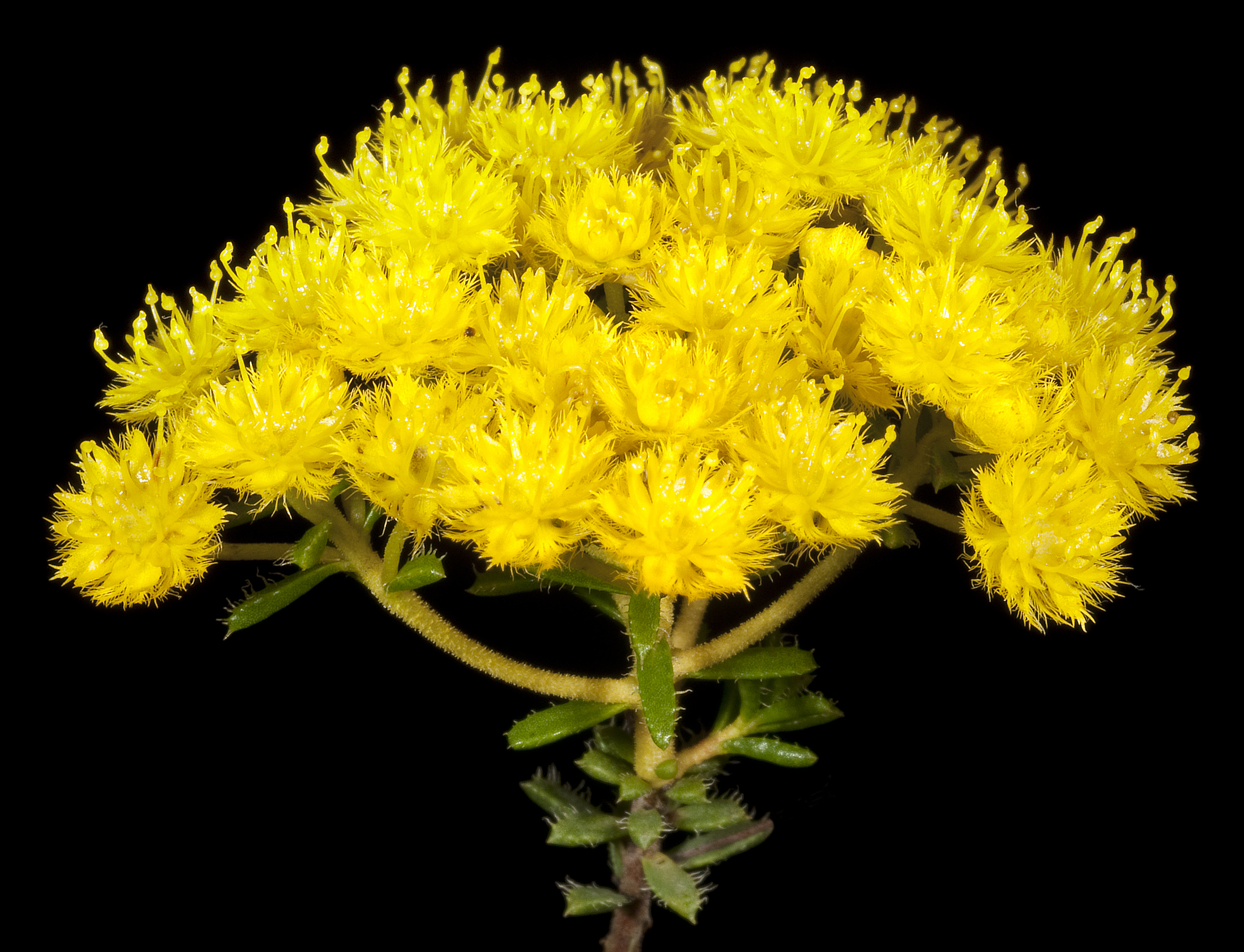

Scientific classification
- Kingdom: Plantae
- Clade: Tracheophytes
- Clade: Angiosperms
- Clade: Eudicots
- Clade: Rosids
- Order: Myrtales
- Family: Myrtaceae
- Genus: Verticordia
- Subgenus: Verticordia subg. Chrysoma
- Section: Verticordia sect. Sigalantha
- Species: V. serrata

Binomial name
- Verticordia serrata (Lindl.) Schauer

= Verticordia serrata =

Species of flowering plant

Verticordia serrata is a flowering plant in the myrtle family, Myrtaceae and is endemic to the south-west of Western Australia. It is a spindly or openly branched shrub with hairy, egg-shaped leaves and flowers which are golden at first, then fade to a greyish colour.

== Description ==
Verticordia serrata is an openly branched shrub which grows to a height of 1.5 m (5 ft) and which usually has one main branch. Its leaves are either elliptic to egg-shaped and 2.5–6 mm (0.1–0.2 in) long or linear in shape and 6–20 mm (0.2–0.8 in) long, depending on variety, but always have hairy eges.

The flowers are usually scented and are arranged in corymb-like groups on erect stalks from 3–8 mm (0.1–0.3 in) long with the longest stalks on the lowest flowers in each group. The floral cup is 0.5–1.0 mm (0.02–0.04 in) long, warty and glabrous. The sepals spread widely, are golden-yellow, turning greyish with age, 2.5–3.5 mm (0.098–0.14 in) long, with 6 to 8 hairy lobes. The petals are a similar colour to the sepals, 2.5–4 mm (0.1–0.2 in) long and egg-shaped with a toothed margin. The style is 2–4 mm (0.08–0.2 in) long, straight and glabrous. Flowering time differs, depending on the variety.

== Taxonomy and naming ==
This species was first formally described by John Lindley in 1839 and given the name Chrysohoe serrata. The description was published in A Sketch of the Vegetation of the Swan River Colony. In 1841, Johannes Conrad Schauer changed the name to Verticordi serrata.

Alex George undertook a review of the genus Verticordia in 1991 and described three varieties of this species:

- Verticordia serrata Schauer var. serrata which has elliptic to egg-shaped leaves with hairs up to 0.5 mm (0.02 in) long and a style that is up to 2.8 mm (0.11 in) long, and flowers from October to January;
- Verticordia serrata var. ciliata A.S.George which has similar leaves to var. serrata but longer leaf hairs and a longer style, flowering from September to December;
- Verticordia serrata var. linearis A.S.George which has linear-shaped, pointed leaves and flowers from September to October.

George placed this species in subgenus Chrysoma, section Sigalantha along with V. integra.

== Distribution and habitat ==
This verticordia occurs in the south-west of Western Australia, each variety with a different range. The most widespread is var. serrata which occurs from near Perth, inland as far as Koonadgin and as far east in coastal areas as Ravensthorpe. All grow in sand, often with gravel, loam or clay in shrubland and woodland, often with other species of verticordia.

== Conservation ==
Variety linearis is classified as "Priority Three" meaning that it is poorly known and known from only a few locations but is not under imminent threat. The other two varieties are classified as "not threatened".

== Use in horticulture ==
All three varieties can be propagated from cuttings, but var. linearis is the easiest to strike. All are described as "ornamental" and "attractive" and also sometimes slow-growing, appear to be hardy when established.
