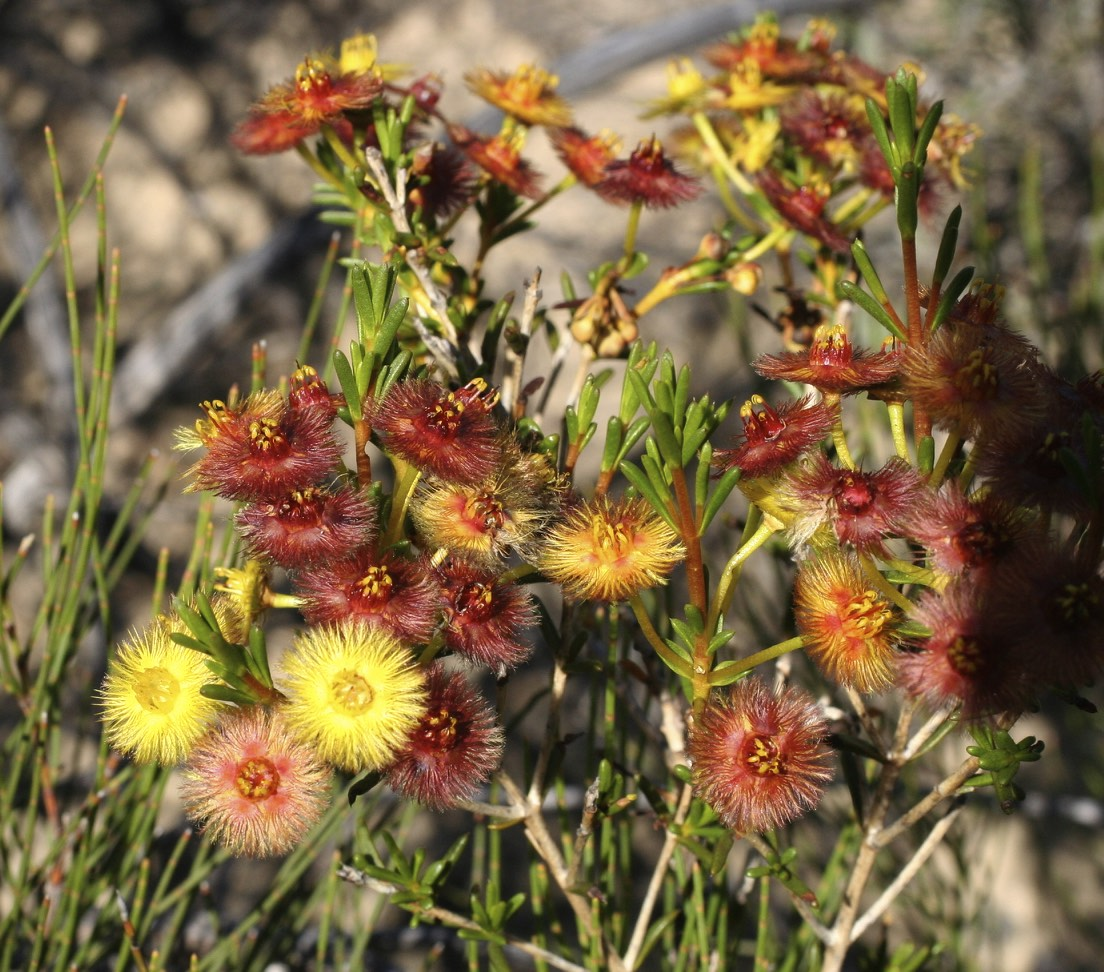
- Verticordia nobilis growing 30km east of Geraldton

Scientific classification
- Kingdom: Plantae
- Clade: Tracheophytes
- Clade: Angiosperms
- Clade: Eudicots
- Clade: Rosids
- Order: Myrtales
- Family: Myrtaceae
- Genus: Verticordia
- Subgenus: Verticordia subg. Chrysoma
- Section: Verticordia sect. Unguiculata
- Species: V. nobilis

Binomial name
- Verticordia nobilis Meisn.

= Verticordia nobilis =

Northern grandiflora

Species of flowering plant

Verticordia nobilis, commonly known as northern grandiflora, is a flowering plant in the myrtle family, Myrtaceae and is endemic to the south-west of Western Australia. It is an openly branched shrub with linear leaves and groups of scented, yellow flowers which turn deep red as they age.

== Description ==
Verticordia nobilis is a shrub which grows to a height of up to 1 m (3 ft) and 0.75 m (2 ft) wide with a single main branch and a few side branches. Its leaves are linear in shape, 5–15 mm (0.2–0.6 in) long, semicircular in cross section with those near the flowers broader and more dished on the upper surface.

The flowers are arranged in corymb-like groups near the ends of the branches, each flower on a stalk 10–25 mm (0.4–1 in) long. The floral cup is about 3 mm (0.1 in) long with a slightly warty, glabrous surface. The sepals are yellow, turning red with age, 5–7 mm (0.2–0.3 in) long, spreading with 10 to 12 hairy lobes. The petals are a similar colour, spreading, 5–6 mm (0.20–0.24 in) long and have long, spreading, thin, finger-like projections. The style is 4–6 mm (0.16–0.24 in) long, straight and glabrous. Flowering time is from August to November.

== Taxonomy and naming ==
Verticordia nobilis was first formally described by Carl Meisner in 1856 from a specimen collected by James Drummond "near the Smith River", now the Nambung River. The description was published in Journal of the Proceedings of the Linnean Society, Botany. Meisner noted "a beautiful species, closely approaching Verticordia grandiflora". The specific epithet (nobilis) is a Latin word meaning "celebrated" or "noble".

When Alex George reviewed the genus Verticordia in 1991, he placed this species in subgenus Chrysoma, section Unguiculata along with V. grandiflora and V. rutilastra.

== Distribution and habitat ==
This verticordia usually grows in sand but also in lateritic gravel and loam, often with other species of Verticordia in kwongan and shrubland. It occurs in and between the Kalbarri National Park, Gingin and Coorow in the Avon Wheatbelt, Geraldton Sandplains, Jarrah Forest and Swan Coastal Plain biogeographic regions.

== Conservation ==
Verticordia nobilis is classified as "Not Threatened" by the Western Australian Government Department of Parks and Wildlife.

== Use in horticulture ==
Northern grandiflora is readily propagated from both cuttings and seed. Although young plants are slow to establish in the garden, when grown in a sunny position in areas of low humidity, appear more hardy and tolerant of frost than V. grandiflora.
