= Verticordia subg. Chrysoma =

Scientific classification
- Kingdom: Plantae
- Clade: Tracheophytes
- Clade: Angiosperms
- Clade: Eudicots
- Clade: Rosids
- Order: Myrtales
- Family: Myrtaceae
- Genus: Verticordia
- Subgenus: Verticordia subg. Chrysoma; Schauer

Sections
- 7 sections: see text

Subgenus of flowering plants

Verticordia subg. Chrysoma is a botanical name for a grouping of similar plant species in the genus Verticordia.

This subgenus contains seven sections, classifying twenty one species, of Alex George's infrageneric arrangement. A number of similar anatomical features differentiate the contained species from the two other subgenera.

The name of this subgenus was first given by Schauer in 1840, likely derived from the Greek chryso- for golden, for the yellow flowered species. The revision of the genus by George devised a new section with this name - Verticordia sect. Chrysoma (Schauer) A.S.George - nominating Verticordia acerosa as the type species.

The leaves are often found to differ at the flowering branch and the base of the plant. They are long and thin, and flattened or needle-like. Small green structures in other Verticordia, found at the edge of the hypanthium, are absent in this taxon. The flowers become red or orange, in some of the contained taxa, but are otherwise yellow.

Verticordia subg. Chrysoma

Section Chrysoma
Section Jugata
Section Unguiculata
Section Sigalantha
Section Chrysorhoe
Section Cooloomia
Section Synandra
