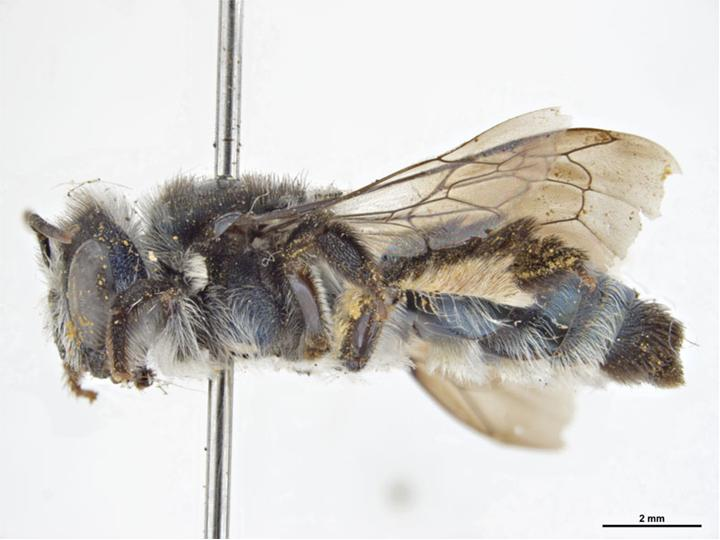
- Female

Scientific classification
- Kingdom: Animalia
- Phylum: Arthropoda
- Clade: Pancrustacea
- Class: Insecta
- Order: Hymenoptera
- Family: Colletidae
- Genus: Leioproctus
- Species: L. chalybeatus

Binomial name
- Leioproctus chalybeatus (Erichson, 1842)

Synonyms
- Andrena chalybeata Erichson, 1842; Leioproctus vigilans Smith, 1879; Paracolletes diodontus Cockerell, 1929; Nodocolletes subdentatus Rayment, 1931; Nodocolletes dentatus Rayment, 1931

= Leioproctus chalybeatus =

Species of bee

Leioproctus chalybeatus, or Leioproctus (Lamprocolletes) chalybeatus, is a species of bee in the family Colletidae and subfamily Colletinae. It is endemic to Australia. It was described by German entomologist Wilhelm Ferdinand Erichson in 1842.

== Distribution and habitat ==
The species occurs in both eastern and western Australia. Type localities include Tasmania as well as Swan River, Eradu Quairading and Moora in Western Australia. It has also been recorded from Jindabyne, Mount Victoria and Jamberoo in New South Wales, and from Mount Buffalo in Victoria.

== Behaviour ==
The adults are flying mellivores. Flowering plants visited by the bees include Grevillea biformis, Verticordia picta, Baeckea pentagonantha and Scaevola spinescens, as well as Leucopogon, Acacia, Kunzea and Eucalyptus species.

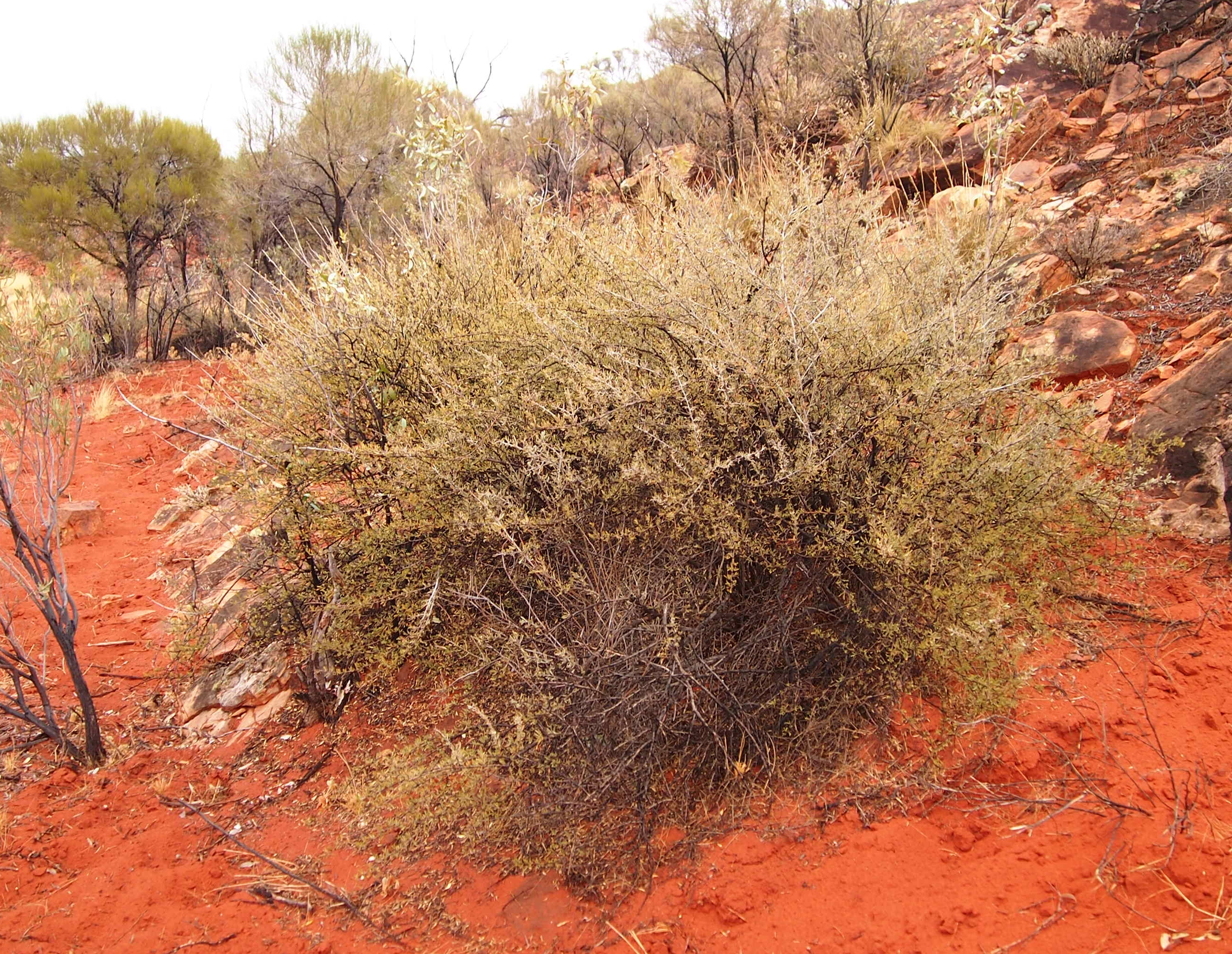
Scaevola spinescens (currant bush), a forage plant of the bees
