= Acacia desertorum =

Scientific classification
- Kingdom: Plantae
- Clade: Tracheophytes
- Clade: Angiosperms
- Clade: Eudicots
- Clade: Rosids
- Order: Fabales
- Family: Fabaceae
- Subfamily: Caesalpinioideae
- Clade: Mimosoid clade
- Genus: Acacia
- Species: A. desertorum

Binomial name
- Acacia desertorum Maiden & Blakely
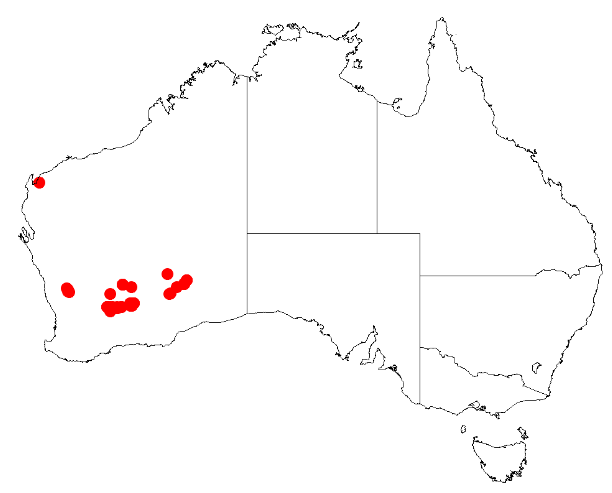
- Occurrence data from AVH

Synonyms
- Racosperma desertorum (Maiden & Blakely) Pedley

Species of legume

Acacia desertorum is a species of flowering plant in the family Fabaceae and is endemic to the southern inland of Western Australia. It is a shrub with terete phyllodes, tooth-like stipules, spherical heads of bright golden yellow flowers and more or less linear, thinly leathery pods.

== Description ==
Acacia desertorum is a shrub that typically grows to a height of 0.6 to 2 metres (2 to 7 ft), and rarely a tree to 4 mm (0.16 in), that has branchlets that are covered with silky hairy between glabrous ribs. The phyllodes are ascending, terete and straight to slightly curved, 50–130 mm (2.0–5.1 in) long and 1–1.5 mm (0.039–0.059 in) in diameter and have 8 to 16 parallel rather broad veins. The flowers are bright golden yellow, and borne in one or two spherical, elliptic or oblong heads 7–9 mm (0.28–0.35 in) long and 6–8 mm (0.24–0.31 in) in diameter, in axils on a peduncle 3–8 mm (0.12–0.31 in) long. Flowering time depends on the variety, and the pods are linear, straight to slightly curved, up to 85 mm (3.3 in) long and 1.5–2 mm (0.059–0.079 in) wide. The seeds are linear, mottled light brown 4.0–4.5 mm (0.16–0.18 in) long with a conical aril about the same length as the seed.

== Taxonomy ==
Acacia desertorum was first formally described in 1927 by the botanists Joseph Maiden and William Blakley in the Journal of the Royal Society of Western Australia from specimens collected in the Victoria Desert by Richard Helms in 1891 during the Elder Exploring Expedition.

In 1995, Richard Cowan and Bruce Maslin described two varieties of A. desertorum in the journal Nuytsia, and the names are accepted by the Australian Plant Census:

- Acacia desertorum Maiden & Blakely var. desertorum has phyllodes with 8 broad veins of approximately equal widths, and flowers in July, and from September to November or sometimes to February.
- Acacia desertorum var. nudipes R.S.Cowan & Maslin. has phyllodes with 16 veins of unequal widths and flowers from August to October.

== Distribution and habitat ==
This species of wattle has a disjunct distribution, occurring in the Southern Cross and Coolgardie areas, and in the Great Victoria Desert in the Coolgardie, Great Victoria Desert and Murchison bioregions of southern inland Western Australia.

== Conservation status ==
Acacia desertorum var. desertorum is listed as "not threatened", but var. nudipes is listed as "Priority Three" by the Government of Western Australia Department of Biodiversity, Conservation and Attractions, meaning that it is poorly known and known from only a few locations but is not under imminent threat,

== See also ==
- List of Acacia species
