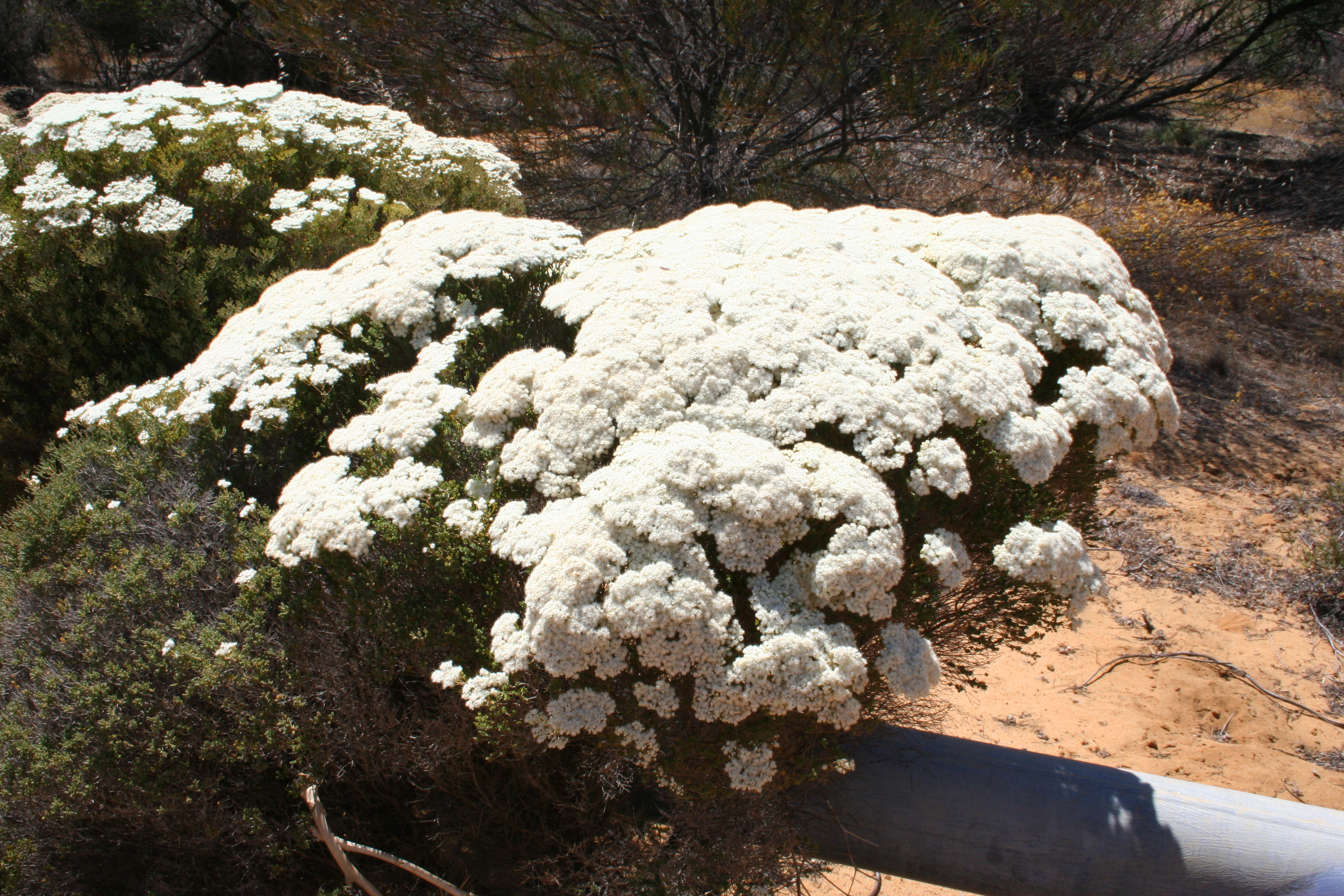

Scientific classification
- Kingdom: Plantae
- Clade: Tracheophytes
- Clade: Angiosperms
- Clade: Eudicots
- Clade: Rosids
- Order: Myrtales
- Family: Myrtaceae
- Genus: Verticordia
- Subgenus: Verticordia subg. Verticordia
- Section: Verticordia sect. Corymbiformis
- Species: V. eriocephala

Binomial name
- Verticordia eriocephala A.S. George

= Verticordia eriocephala =

Wild cauliflower

Species of flowering plant

Verticordia eriocephala, commonly known as lambswool, and common, native or wild cauliflower is a flowering plant in the myrtle family, Myrtaceae and is endemic to the south-west of Western Australia. It is a shrub with one densely branching, spreading main stem, small leaves and dense heads of creamy-white flowers, giving rise to the common names "lambswool" and "cauliflower". It is widespread over its range but becoming less common because of land clearing and illegal collecting of the flowers.

== Description ==
Verticordia eriocephala is a shrub which grows to a height of 2 m (7 ft) or more and a spread of 0.15–1.5 m (0.5–5 ft) and which has a single, highly branched stem at its base. Its leaves are elliptic in shape, dished and 3–4 mm (0.1–0.2 in) long, becoming shorter and broader near the flowering parts at the top.

The flowers are scented and arranged in dense corymb-like groups, each flower on a stalk about 1.5 mm (0.06 in) long. The floral cup is hemispherical, 0.7–1.0 mm (0.03–0.04 in) long, constricted above the middle and hairy near its base. The sepals are creamy-white, 2.0–2.5 mm (0.079–0.098 in) long, with 5 hairy lobes and with one or two slender cilia extending out 3.8 mm (0.1 in). The petals are white, broadly egg-shaped to almost round, about 1.5 mm (0.06 in) long, with a finely toothed edge. The style is straight, 3.5–4.5 mm (0.1–0.2 in) long and glabrous. Flowering time is from September to January and the plant may flower after attaining a height of only 10 cm (4 in).

The leaves of this species are shorter and wider than those of Verticordia polytricha and is distinguished from that species and from Verticordia capillaris by the extent of hairiness in the flowering structures. It is also similar in appearance to Verticordia brownii.

== Taxonomy and naming ==
Early collections of this verticordia were made in the 1890s by Richard Helms and more reliably, by William Vincent Fitzgerald in 1898 and for many years it was incorrectly described as Verticordia brownii. Verticordia eriocephala was first formally described by Alex George in 1991 and the description was published in Nuytsia from specimens collected near Mount Adams, north of Eneabba by Alex and Elizabeth George. According to Alex George, the specific epithet (eriocephala) is derived from the Greek erion (wool) and cephala (head), in reference to the appearance of the flowering plants as large white heads. Elizabeth George mentioned cephale as Greek word for "head" instead. The ancient Greek word for "head" is kephalē (κεφαλή).

George placed this species in subgenus Verticordia, section Corymbiformis along with V. polytricha, V. densiflora, V. brownii, and V. capillaris.

== Distribution and habitat ==
This verticordia grows in yellow, grey, and white sands and on gravel and is widespread on sand hills and plains. It occasionally occupies granite sites, and is often seen growing with other verticordia species. It occurs throughout the south-west from as far north as Mount Adams to as far east as Point Culver and as far inland as Boorabbin National Park.

== Conservation ==
Verticordia eriocephala is classified as "not threatened" by the Western Australian Government Department of Parks and Wildlife, however its number are decreasing due to illegal harvesting of flowers from wild plants.

== Use in horticulture ==
This species is an attractive shrub when in bud and in flower and its dense bushy habit make it useful when not in flower. It strikes readily from cuttings but suitable material is often hard to obtain, even from cultivated specimens. It can also be propagated from seed. Established plants are hardy and frost tolerant but are killed by pruning when the entire flowering head is cut below the foliage.
