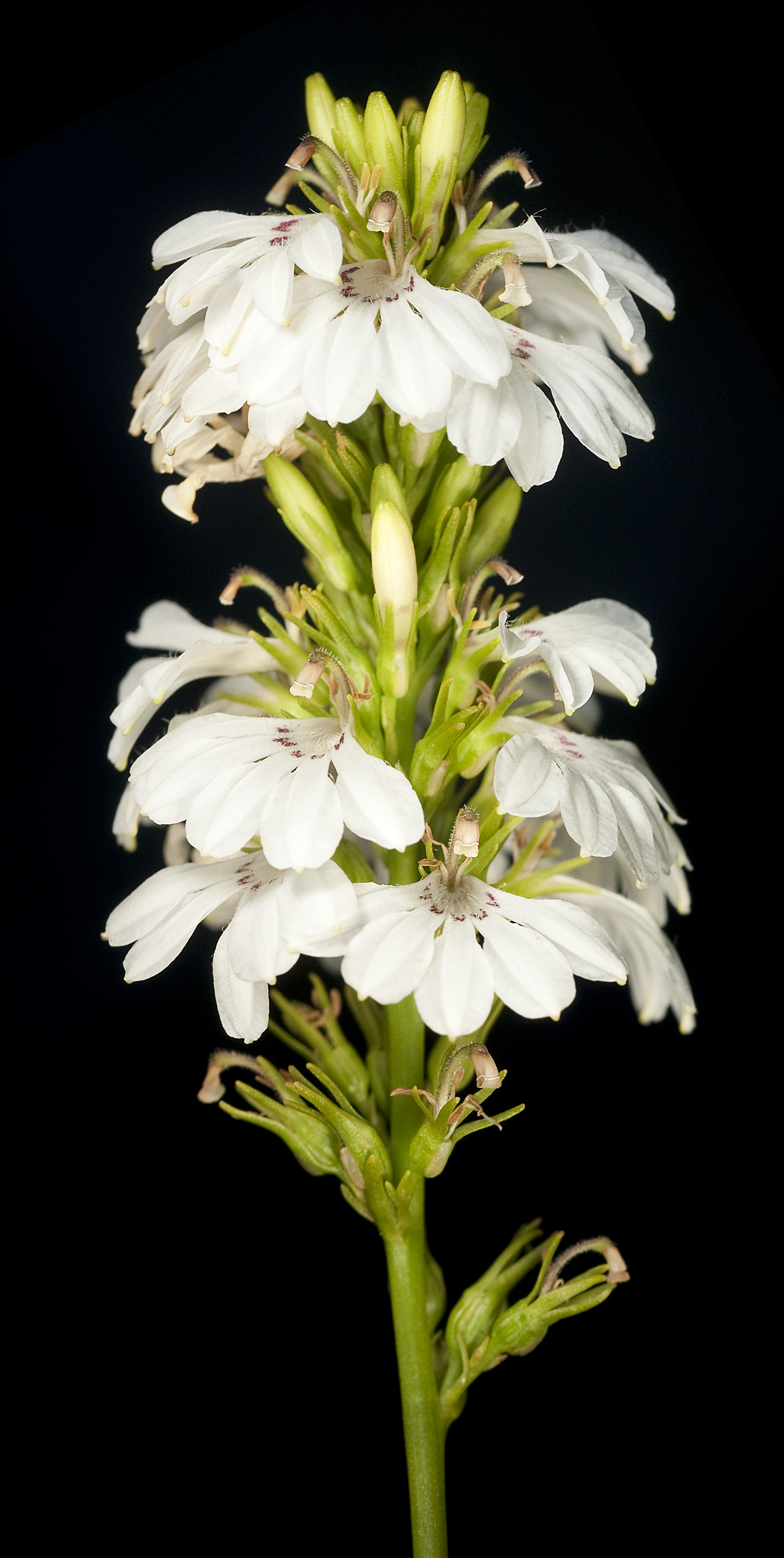

Scientific classification
- Kingdom: Plantae
- Clade: Tracheophytes
- Clade: Angiosperms
- Clade: Eudicots
- Clade: Asterids
- Order: Asterales
- Family: Goodeniaceae
- Genus: Goodenia
- Species: G. watsonii

Binomial name
- Goodenia watsonii F.Muell. & Tate

= Goodenia watsonii =

Species of plant

Goodenia watsonii is a species of flowering plant in the family Goodeniaceae and is endemic to the south-west of Western Australia. It is a perennial herb with egg-shaped to elliptic leaves mostly at the base of the plant, and thyrses of white, cream-coloured or bluish flowers.

== Description ==
Goodenia watsonii is perennial herb that typically grows to a height of 15–70 cm (5.9–27.6 in) with a thick stem. It has egg-shaped to elliptic leaves 30–150 mm (1.2–5.9 in) long, 4–10 mm (0.16–0.39 in) wide at the base of the plant and sometimes with toothed edges. The flowers are arranged in thyrses up to 200 mm (7.9 in) long on a peduncle up to 40 mm (1.6 in) long, each flower on a pedicel 1–2 mm (0.039–0.079 in) long with linear bracts up to 5 mm (0.20 in) long and shorter bracteoles. The sepals are narrow egg-shaped, 1–2 mm (0.039–0.079 in) long, the corolla white, cream-coloured or bluish, 4–8 mm (0.16–0.31 in) long. The corolla lobes are 2–4 mm (0.079–0.157 in) long with wings about 0.5 mm (0.020 in) wide. Flowering occurs from October to February and the fruit is a more or less spherical capsule 4–5 mm (0.16–0.20 in) in diameter.

== Taxonomy and naming ==
Goodenia watsonii was first formally described in 1893 by Ferdinand von Mueller and Ralph Tate in Botanisches Centralblatt from material collected by Richard Helms "at Gnarlbine" during the Elder Exploring Expedition. The specific epithet (watsonii) honours "Professor Watson, of the Adelaide University.

In 1990, Roger Charles Carolin described two subspecies in the journal Telopea and the names are accepted by the Australian Plant Census:

- Goodenia watsonii subsp. glandulosa Carolin has the peduncles, pedicels ovary and parts of the petals covered with soft glandular hairs, and a bluish corolla with a yellow centre, or whitish;
- Goodenia watsonii F.Muell. & Tate subsp. watsonii has most glabrous flower parts and a white corolla.

== Distribution and habitat ==
This goodenia grows in heath in the south-west of Western Australia. Subspecies glandulosa is restricteed to areas between Lake Grace and Hyden.

== Conservation status ==
Both subspecies of G. watsonii are classed as "not threatened" by the Western Australian Government Department of Parks and Wildlife.
