= Goodenia anfracta =

Zig-zag hand-flower

Scientific classification
- Kingdom: Plantae
- Clade: Tracheophytes
- Clade: Angiosperms
- Clade: Eudicots
- Clade: Asterids
- Order: Asterales
- Family: Goodeniaceae
- Genus: Goodenia
- Species: G. anfracta

Binomial name
- Goodenia anfracta J.M.Black

Species of plant

Goodenia anfracta, commonly known as zig-zag hand-flower, is a species of flowering plant in the family Goodeniaceae and is endemic to central Australia. It is a prostrate or low-lying shrub with linear and lance-shaped to egg-shaped leaves, small racemes of yellow flowers with small, leaf-like bracteoles at the base, and more or less spherical fruit.

== Description ==
Goodenia anfracta is a prostrate or low-lying herb that typically grows to a height of 10 cm (3.9 in) and has hairy, zig-zag branches. The stem leaves are needle-shaped, sometimes clustered and the leaves at the base of the stem are lance-shaped, to egg-shaped with the narrower end towards the base, 10–30 mm (0.39–1.18 in) long and 2–4 mm (0.079–0.157 in) wide, sometimes with teeth on the edges. The flowers are arranged in small racemes up to 100 mm (3.9 in) long, each flower on a pedicel 8–16 mm (0.31–0.63 in) long. The sepals are lance-shaped to elliptic, about 3 mm (0.12 in) long and the corolla is yellow, 8–9 mm (0.31–0.35 in) long and hairy inside. The lower lobes of the corolla are about 3 mm (0.12 in) long with wings up to 1.5 mm (0.059 in) wide. Flowering has been observed in August and the fruit is a more or less spherical capsule.

== Taxonomy and naming ==
Goodenia anfracta was first formally described in 1927 by John McConnell Black in the Transactions and proceedings of the Royal Society of South Australia from material collected by Richard Helms in 1891. The specific epithet (anfracta) means "zig-zag" or "crooked".

== Distribution and habitat ==
Zig-zag hand-flower grows in saline sand, near salty springs or salt lakes in northern South Australia, southern parts of the Northern Territory and central-eastern Western Australia.
