= Verticordia densiflora var. pedunculata =

Conservation status
- Endangered (EPBC Act)

Scientific classification
- Kingdom: Plantae
- Clade: Tracheophytes
- Clade: Angiosperms
- Clade: Eudicots
- Clade: Rosids
- Order: Myrtales
- Family: Myrtaceae
- Genus: Verticordia
- Species: V. densiflora
- Variety: V. d. var. pedunculata

Trinomial name
- Verticordia densiflora var. pedunculata (Turcz.) A.S.George

Variety of flowering plant

Verticordia densiflora var. pedunculata, commonly known as long-stalked featherflower, is a flowering plant in the myrtle family, Myrtaceae and is endemic to the south-west of Western Australia. It is a shrub with small leaves and mauve-pink flowers which fade to white. It is one of five varieties of the species Verticordia densiflora and is distinguished from the others by its much longer flower stalks.

== Description ==
Verticordia densiflora var. pedunculata is a shrub which grows to a height and width of 30–60 cm (10–20 in) and is sometimes open and spindly, otherwise bushy and openly branched. The leaves are greyish green and vary in shape from linear to egg-shaped but those near the flowers are lance-shaped and 1.0–1.5 mm (0.04–0.06 in) wide.

The flowers are scented and arranged in corymb-like groups on erect stalks usually from 5 to 9 mm (0.2 to 0.4 in) long. The flowers are pale to bright mauve-pink and fade to white as they age. The floral cup is shaped like half a sphere, about 1.5 mm (0.06 in) long, smooth but hairy near its base. The sepals are 3.5–4 mm (0.14–0.16 in) long, with 2 to 4 lobes which have a fringe of coarse hairs. The petals are a similar colour to the sepals, 1.6–2.0 mm (0.06–0.08 in) long, egg-shaped with many filaments on their ends. The style is 5–6 mm (0.20–0.24 in) long, extends beyond the petals, is curved and hairy and has a thickened base. Flowering occurs from December to January.

== Taxonomy and naming ==
Verticordia densiflora was first formally described by John Lindley in 1839 and the description was published in A Sketch of the Vegetation of the Swan River Colony. In 1991, Alex George undertook a review of the genus Verticordia and described five varieties of Verticordia densiflora including this variety.

== Distribution and habitat ==
This variety of V. densiflora grows in sandy soil or sand with clay or loam, often in winter-wet areas or in degraded, weed-infested areas. It is found in a small area near Busselton in the Jarrah Forest and Swan Coastal Plain biogeographic regions.

== Conservation ==
Verticordia densiflora var. pedunculata is classified as "Threatened Flora (Declared Rare Flora — Extant)" by the Western Australian Government Department of Parks and Wildlife and as "Endangered" (EN) under the Australian Government Environment Protection and Biodiversity Conservation Act 1999 (EPBC Act). In 1997 the total population of mature plants was estimated to be 500. The main threats to the variety are thought to be land clearing for urban development and degradation of road verges.

== Use in horticulture ==
Little is known about the growing requirements of this variety but research needs to be undertaken to help ensure its continued existence.
