= Verticordia sect. Corymbiformis =

Scientific classification
- Kingdom: Plantae
- Clade: Tracheophytes
- Clade: Angiosperms
- Clade: Eudicots
- Clade: Rosids
- Order: Myrtales
- Family: Myrtaceae
- Genus: Verticordia
- Subgenus: Verticordia subg. Verticordia
- Section: Verticordia sect. Corymbiformis; A.S.George

Species
- 5 species: see text.

Group of flowering plants

Verticordia sect. Corymbiformis is one of eleven sections in the subgenus Verticordia. It includes five species of plants in the genus Verticordia. Plants in this section are mostly compact shrubs 0.3–1 m (1–3 ft) tall with a constricted floral cup, fringed or divided sepal lobes and dense heads of small flowers. When Alex George reviewed the genus in 1991 he formally described this section, publishing the description in the journal Nuytsia. The name Corymbiformis is derived from the Latin word corymbus meaning "a bunch of flowers" and the suffix -formis meaning "shaped" referring to the flower arrangement of the species in this section.

The type species for this section is Verticordia brownii and the other four species are V. polytricha, V. densiflora, V. eriocephala and V. capillaris.
