= Verticordia sect. Integripetala =

Scientific classification
- Kingdom: Plantae
- Clade: Tracheophytes
- Clade: Angiosperms
- Clade: Eudicots
- Clade: Rosids
- Order: Myrtales
- Family: Myrtaceae
- Genus: Verticordia
- Subgenus: Verticordia subg. Eperephes
- Section: Verticordia sect. Integripetala

Type species
- Verticordia picta

Species
- 5 species: see text.

Group of flowering plants

Verticordia sect. Integripetala is one of six sections in the subgenus Eperephes. It includes five species of plants in the genus Verticordia. Plants in this section are mostly small, bushy shrubs with needle-like leaves and dark red to pink or creamy-white flowers with their petals having smooth edges. Most species are confined to the wheatbelt. When Alex George reviewed the genus in 1991, he described the section and gave it the name Integripetala. The name Integripetala is from the Latin words integer meaning "whole", "entire" or "sound" and petalum meaning "petal" referring smooth or entire edges of the petals in these species.

The type species for this section is Verticordia picta and the other four species are V. helmsii, V. rennieana, V. interioris and V. mirabilis.
