= Verticordia densiflora var. cespitosa =

Scientific classification
- Kingdom: Plantae
- Clade: Tracheophytes
- Clade: Angiosperms
- Clade: Eudicots
- Clade: Rosids
- Order: Myrtales
- Family: Myrtaceae
- Genus: Verticordia
- Species: V. densiflora
- Variety: V. d. var. cespitosa

Trinomial name
- Verticordia densiflora var. cespitosa (Turcz.) A.S.George

Variety of flowering plant

Verticordia densiflora var. cespitosa is a flowering plant in the myrtle family, Myrtaceae and is endemic to the south-west of Western Australia. It is a shrub with small leaves and pink, or pink and white flowers. It is one of five varieties of the species Verticordia densiflora.

== Description ==
Verticordia densiflora var. cespitosa is a shrub which grows to a height of 20–70 cm (8–30 in) and has a fire-tolerant lignotuber. The leaves vary in shape from linear to egg-shaped and those near the flowers are 0.8–1.5 mm (0.03–0.06 in) wide.

The flowers are honey-scented and arranged in corymb-like groups on erect stalks usually from 2 to 3 mm (0.08 to 0.1 in) long, sometimes 4 mm (0.2 in) long. The flowers are silvery-pink to bright mauve-pink and white, sometimes all pale to deep pink. The floral cup is shaped like half a sphere, about 1.5 mm (0.06 in) long, smooth but hairy near its base. The sepals have a base which is a short, broad strap and are 2.5–3.5 mm (0.098–0.14 in) long, with 2 to 4 lobes which have a fringe of coarse hairs. The petals are a similar colour to the sepals, 1.2–1.9 mm (0.05–0.07 in) long, egg-shaped with many filaments on their ends. The style is 5–6 mm (0.20–0.24 in) long, extends beyond the petals, is curved and hairy and has a thickened base. Flowering occurs from October to May.

== Taxonomy and naming ==
Verticordia cespitosa was first formally described by Nikolai Turczaninow in 1847 and the description was published in Bulletin de la Société Impériale des Naturalistes de Moscou. In 1991, Alex George undertook a review of the genus Verticordia, described five varieties of Verticordia densiflora and recognised V. cespitosa as a variety of V. densiflora. The epithet "cespitosa" is "from the Latin caespitosus (tufted), in reference to the habit of the type specimen, deliberately spelt cespitosa by Nicolas Turczaninow", both in the protologue and on the holotype sheet.

== Distribution and habitat ==
This variety of V. densiflora grows in sand, often associated with granite or spongolite, sometimes in poorly drained, low-lying areas. It is found in heath, shrubland or woodland from near Geraldton in the north to near Esperance on the south coast and inland as far as Dowerin. It occurs in the Avon Wheatbelt, Coolgardie, Esperance Plains, Geraldton Sandplains, Jarrah Forest, Mallee and Swan Coastal Plain biogeographic regions.

== Conservation ==
Verticordia densiflora var. cespitosa is classified as "not threatened" by the Western Australian Government Department of Parks and Wildlife.

== Use in horticulture ==
There are several forms of this variety - one is a tall, open shrub which often has large flower heads and another is compact, rounded and produces masses of flowers. Both are relatively hardy plants, even in more humid areas such as Sydney, will grow in a range of soils and are relatively tolerant of frost. Propagation is easy from cuttings and from seed, although the germination rate is relatively low.
