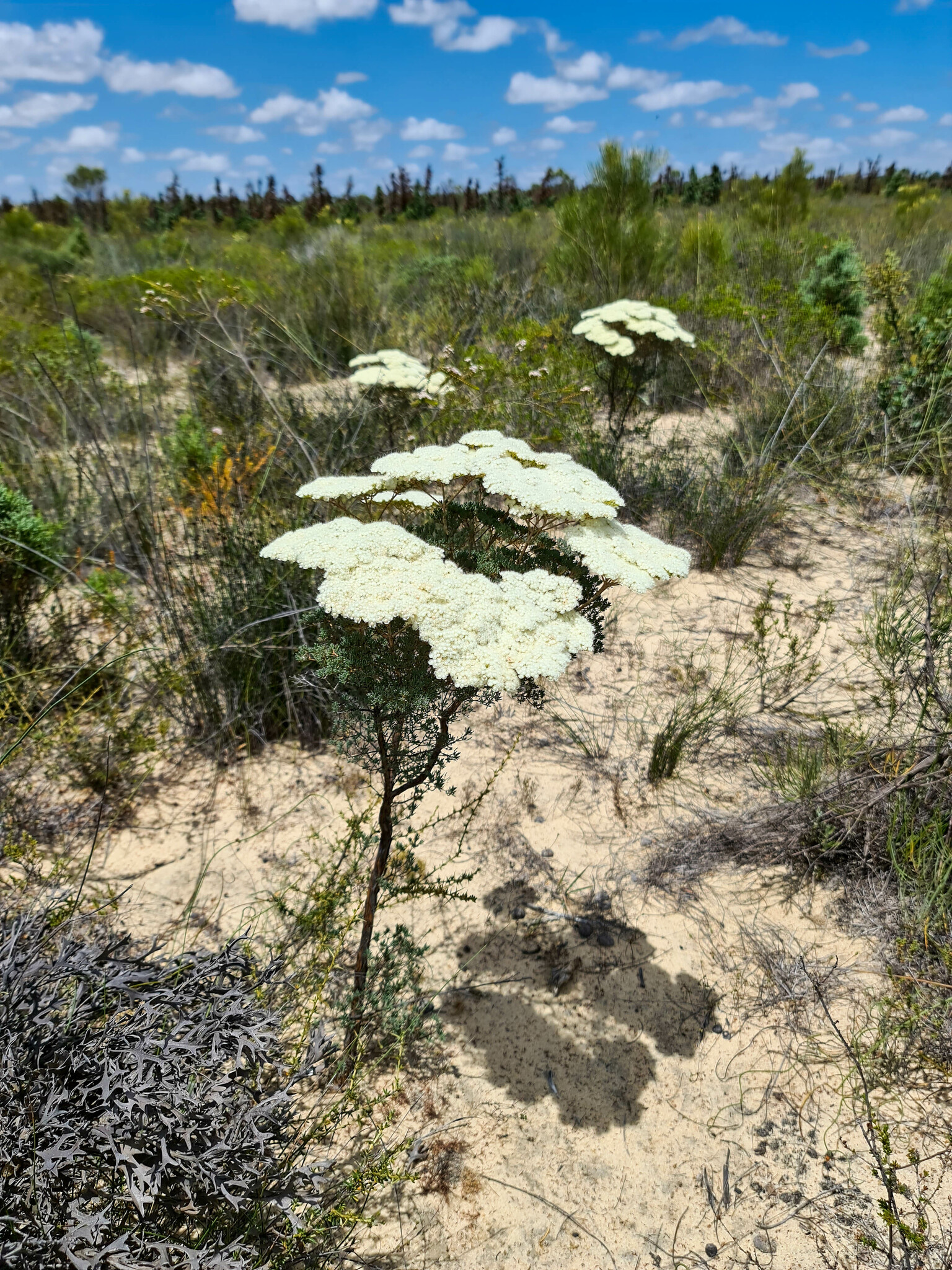

Conservation status
- Priority Four — Rare Taxa (DEC)

Scientific classification
- Kingdom: Plantae
- Clade: Tracheophytes
- Clade: Angiosperms
- Clade: Eudicots
- Clade: Rosids
- Order: Myrtales
- Family: Myrtaceae
- Genus: Verticordia
- Subgenus: Verticordia subg. Verticordia
- Section: Verticordia sect. Corymbiformis
- Species: V. capillaris

Binomial name
- Verticordia capillaris A.S.George

= Verticordia capillaris =

Species of shrub

Verticordia capillaris is a species of flowering plant in the myrtle family, Myrtaceae and is endemic to the south-west of Western Australia. It is a shrub with a single stem at the base, small leaves and creamy white or occasionally pink flowers in dense corymb-like groups. It is common in small areas near Geraldton.

== Description ==
Verticordia capillaris is a shrub which grows to a height of 0.2–1.5 m (0.7–5 ft) and a spread of 0.2–0.9 m (0.7–3 ft) and which has a single, highly branched stem at its base. Its leaves are linear to club-shaped, roughly circular in cross-section, 2–4 mm (0.08–0.2 in) long, with the leaves near the flowers more club-shaped than those further down the stems.

The flowers are lightly scented and arranged in corymb-like groups, each flower on an erect stalk 2–5 mm (0.08–0.2 in) long. The floral cup is shaped like half a sphere, constricted above the middle, about 1.0 mm (0.04 in) long and hairy. The sepals are creamy-white, occasionally pink, 2.0 mm (0.08 in) long, with 2 or 5 main lobes but the entire border of the sepals is feather-like. The petals are the same colour as the sepals, 1.2–1.5 mm (0.05–0.06 in) long, egg-shaped and covered with short hairs. The style is purple coloured, straight and 4–5 mm (0.2–0.2 in) long. Flowering time is from September to November.

== Taxonomy and naming ==
Verticordia capillaris was first formally described by Alex George in 1991 and the description was published in Nuytsia from specimens collected in Kalbarri National Park by Alex George and Bob Wemm. The specific epithet (capillaris) is "named from the Latin capillaris (hair-like), in reference to the very slender style".

George placed this species in subgenus Verticordia, section Corymbiformis along with V. polytricha, V. densiflora, V. eriocephala and V. brownii.

== Distribution and habitat ==
This verticordia grows in sand, sandy clay or sandy loam in tall shrubland in areas near the Kalbarri National Park and south to near Mullewa in the Avon Wheatbelt, Geraldton Sandplains and Yalgoo biogeographic regions.

== Conservation ==
Verticordia capillaris is classified as "Priority Four" by the Government of Western Australia Department of Parks and Wildlife, meaning that is rare or near threatened.

== Use in horticulture ==
This species is very rare in cultivation although one plant which was originally transplanted from land that was later cleared for agriculture has survived for more than 15 years. Otherwise the species has proven difficult to introduce to horticulture.
