= Verticordia densiflora var. rosteostella =

Conservation status
- Priority Three — Poorly Known Taxa (DEC)

Scientific classification
- Kingdom: Plantae
- Clade: Tracheophytes
- Clade: Angiosperms
- Clade: Eudicots
- Clade: Rosids
- Order: Myrtales
- Family: Myrtaceae
- Genus: Verticordia
- Species: V. densiflora
- Variety: V. d. var. rosteostella

Trinomial name
- Verticordia densiflora var. rosteostella A.S.George

Variety of flowering plant

Verticordia densiflora var. rosteostella is a flowering plant in the myrtle family, Myrtaceae and is endemic to the south-west of Western Australia. It is a shrub with small leaves and small groups of star-like, yellowish and pink flowers. It is one of 5 varieties of the species Verticordia densiflora.

== Description ==
Verticordia densiflora var. rosteostella is an openly branched shrub which usually grows to a height of 30–60 cm (10–20 in) and width of 40–90 cm (20–40 in) but sometimes grows as high as 1.3 m (4 ft). The leaves vary in shape from linear to egg-shaped and those near the flowers are 1.5–2.0 mm (0.06–0.08 in) wide.

The flowers are scented and arranged in many small groups on erect stalks from 2–4 mm (0.08–0.2 in) long. The flowers are star-like, creamy-white and pink, sometimes lemon and pink. The floral cup is shaped like half a sphere, about 1.5 mm (0.06 in) long, smooth but hairy near its base. The sepals are 2.3–2.6 mm (0.09–0.1 in) long, with 3 lobes which have a fringe of coarse hairs. The petals are a similar colour to the sepals, 0.8–1.9 mm (0.03–0.07 in) long, egg-shaped with many filaments on their ends. The style is 5–6 mm (0.20–0.24 in) long, extending beyond the petals and is curved and hairy. Flowering occurs from September to December.

== Taxonomy and naming ==
Verticordia densiflora was first formally described by John Lindley in 1839 and the description was published in A Sketch of the Vegetation of the Swan River Colony. In 1991, Alex George undertook a review of the genus Verticordia and described five varieties of Verticordia densiflora including this variety.

== Distribution and habitat ==
This variety of V. densiflora usually grows in sand, sometimes with gravel or loam, often with other species of Verticordia in heath and shrubland. It occurs between Kalbarri and Eneabba near the coast and as far inland as Morawa in the Avon Wheatbelt and Geraldton Sandplains biogeographic regions.

== Conservation ==
Verticordia densiflora var. rosteostella is classified as "Priority Three" by the Western Australian Government Department of Parks and Wildlife meaning that it is poorly known and known from only a few locations but is not under imminent threat.

== Use in horticulture ==
This variety is difficult to propagate and few attempts have been successful. Its attractive appearance in flower in the wild suggests it has horticultural potential.
