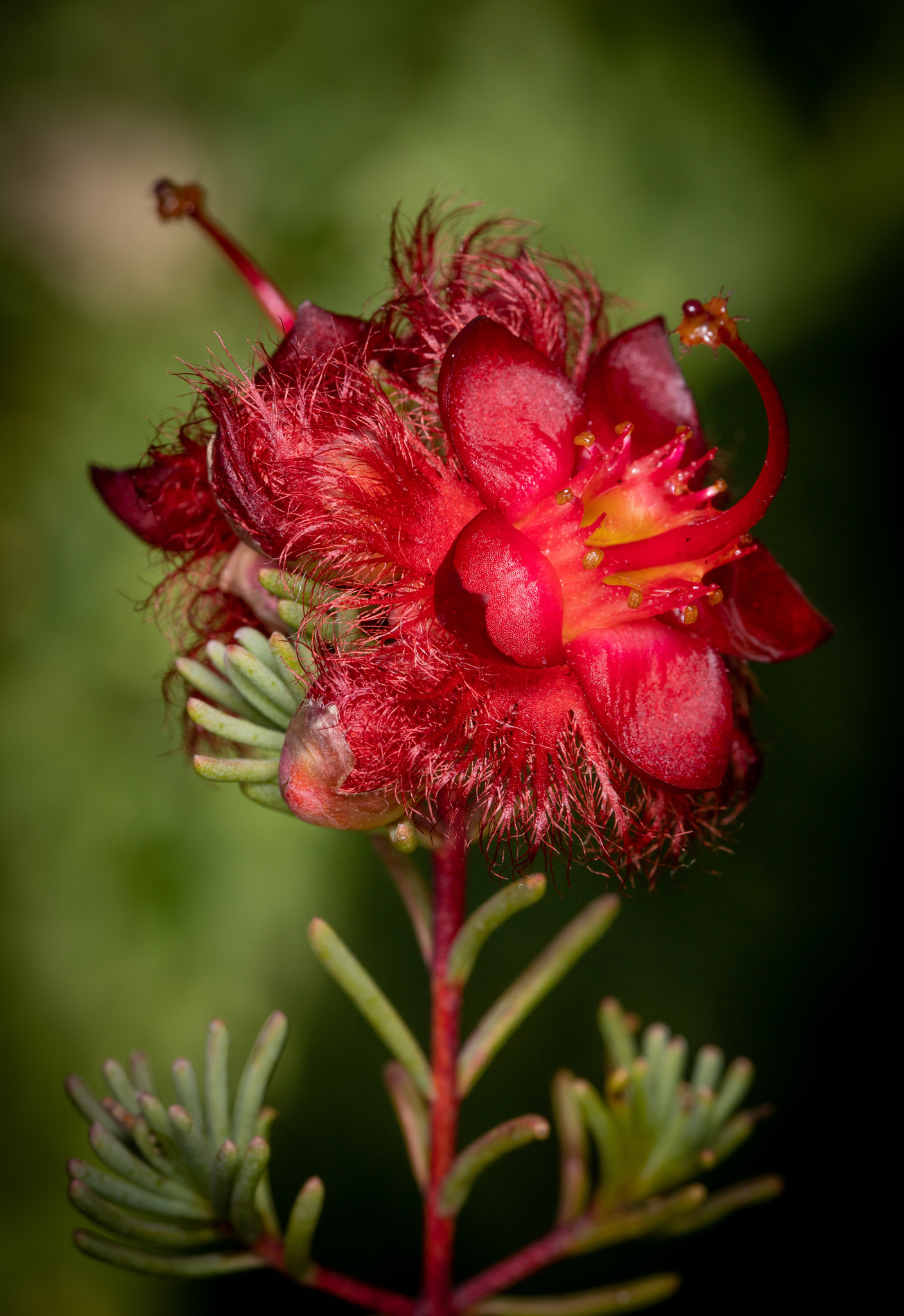

Conservation status
- Priority One — Poorly Known Taxa (DEC)

Scientific classification
- Kingdom: Plantae
- Clade: Tracheophytes
- Clade: Angiosperms
- Clade: Eudicots
- Clade: Rosids
- Order: Myrtales
- Family: Myrtaceae
- Genus: Verticordia
- Subgenus: Verticordia subg. Eperephes
- Section: Verticordia sect. Integripetala
- Species: V. mirabilis

Binomial name
- Verticordia mirabilis Eliz.George & A.S.George

= Verticordia mirabilis =

Species of flowering plant

Verticordia mirabilis is a species of flowering plant in the myrtle family, Myrtaceae and is endemic to a small area in the Gibson Desert. It is a bushy, spreading shrub with its leaves mostly crowded on short side branches and with large, deep red flowers in small groups in spring.

== Description ==
Verticordia mirabilis is a bushy shrub which grows to a height of 30–60 cm (10–20 in) and about 60 cm (20 in) wide but sometimes grows as high as 1 m (3 ft). Its leaves are crowded on short side-branches, linear in shape, triangular or almost circular in cross-section, 3–6.5 mm (0.1–0.3 in) long and have small, irregular teeth near the tips.

The flowers are arranged singly or in small groups near the ends of the branches, each flower 20–23 mm (0.8–0.9 in) in diameter on a thick stalk 2–3 mm (0.08–0.1 in) long. The floral cup is top-shaped, 4–5 mm (0.16–0.20 in) long glabrous with 5 ribs and 5 large swellings near the top. The sepals are pale pink, 10–11 mm (0.39–0.43 in) long 16 mm (0.6 in) wide and have 6 to 8 hairy lobes. The sepals also have two hairy, ear-like appendages which bend over the hypanthium. The petals are spreading, dark red, egg-shaped, sometimes have a few irregular teeth and are 8–11 mm (0.3–0.4 in) long. The style is 16–20 mm (0.6–0.8 in) long with a few hairs near the tip. Flowering time is mainly during September and October.

== Taxonomy and naming ==
Verticordia mirabilis was first formally described by Elizabeth and Alex George in 2001 from specimen collected near Warburton and the description was published in Nuytsia. The specific epithet (mirabilis) is derived from a Latin word meaning "wonderful" or "strange" referring to "the wonder and astonishment of discovering a species of Verticordia so far beyond the previously known occurrence of the genus, in a desert habitat."

This species was placed in subgenus Eperephes, section Integripetala along with helmsii, V. rennieana, V. interioris, and V. picta.

== Distribution and habitat ==
This verticordia is only found in lateritic soil on a rocky breakaway south of Warburton, growing with Verticordia jamiesonii in the Gibson Desert biogeographic region.

== Conservation ==
Verticordia mirabilis is classified as "Priority One" by the Western Australian Government Department of Parks and Wildlife meaning that it is known from only one or a few locations which are potentially at risk.

== Use in horticulture ==
This recently discovered species has been propagated from cuttings and grown in pots to flowering stage but its horticultural requirements are not yet well understood.
