= Verticordia densiflora var. stelluligera =

Scientific classification
- Kingdom: Plantae
- Clade: Tracheophytes
- Clade: Angiosperms
- Clade: Eudicots
- Clade: Rosids
- Order: Myrtales
- Family: Myrtaceae
- Genus: Verticordia
- Species: V. densiflora
- Variety: V. d. var. stelluligera

Trinomial name
- Verticordia densiflora var. stelluligera A.S.George

Variety of flowering plant

Verticordia densiflora var. stelluligera is a flowering plant in the myrtle family, Myrtaceae and is endemic to the south-west of Western Australia. It is an openly branched shrub with small leaves and small clusters of yellowish or pink and cream flowers. It is one of 5 varieties of the species Verticordia densiflora.

== Description ==
Verticordia densiflora var. stelluligera is an openly branched shrub which grows to a height of 0.4–2 m (1–7 ft). The leaves vary in shape from linear to egg-shaped and those near the flowers are egg-shaped, dished and 2.0–2.5 mm (0.08–0.1 in) wide.

The flowers are scented and arranged in many small groups on erect stalks from 1.5–2 mm (0.06–0.08 in), sometimes 4 mm (0.2 in) long. The flowers are white to cream and lemon-coloured, or bright yellow, or pink and cream-coloured. The floral cup is shaped like half a sphere, about 1.5 mm (0.06 in) long, smooth but hairy near its base. The sepals are 2.4–2.6 mm (0.09–0.1 in) long, with 3 lobes which have a fringe of coarse hairs. The petals are a similar colour to the sepals, 1.4–1.7 mm (0.06–0.07 in) long, egg-shaped with many filaments on their ends. The style is 4–5 mm (0.16–0.20 in) long, extending beyond the petals and is curved and hairy. Flowering occurs from September to December.

== Taxonomy and naming ==
Verticordia densiflora was first formally described by John Lindley in 1839 and the description was published in A Sketch of the Vegetation of the Swan River Colony. In 1991, Alex George undertook a review of the genus Verticordia and described five varieties of Verticordia densiflora including this variety.

== Distribution and habitat ==
This variety of V. densiflora usually grows in sand, sometimes with gravel or loam, often with other species of Verticordia in heath and shrubland. It occurs between Kalbarri and Eneabba near the coast and as far inland as Morawa and Mullewa in the Avon Wheatbelt and Geraldton Sandplains biogeographic regions.

== Conservation ==
Verticordia densiflora var. stelluligera is classified as "not threatened" by the Western Australian Government Department of Parks and Wildlife.

== Use in horticulture ==
This variety has been propagated from cuttings but the young plants have been susceptible to fungus attacks. Plants treated with fungicide have grown well in sand topped with gravel. Cultivated plants have flowered well producing blooms that are attractive in floral arrangements and which, when dried retain their colour for a few months.
