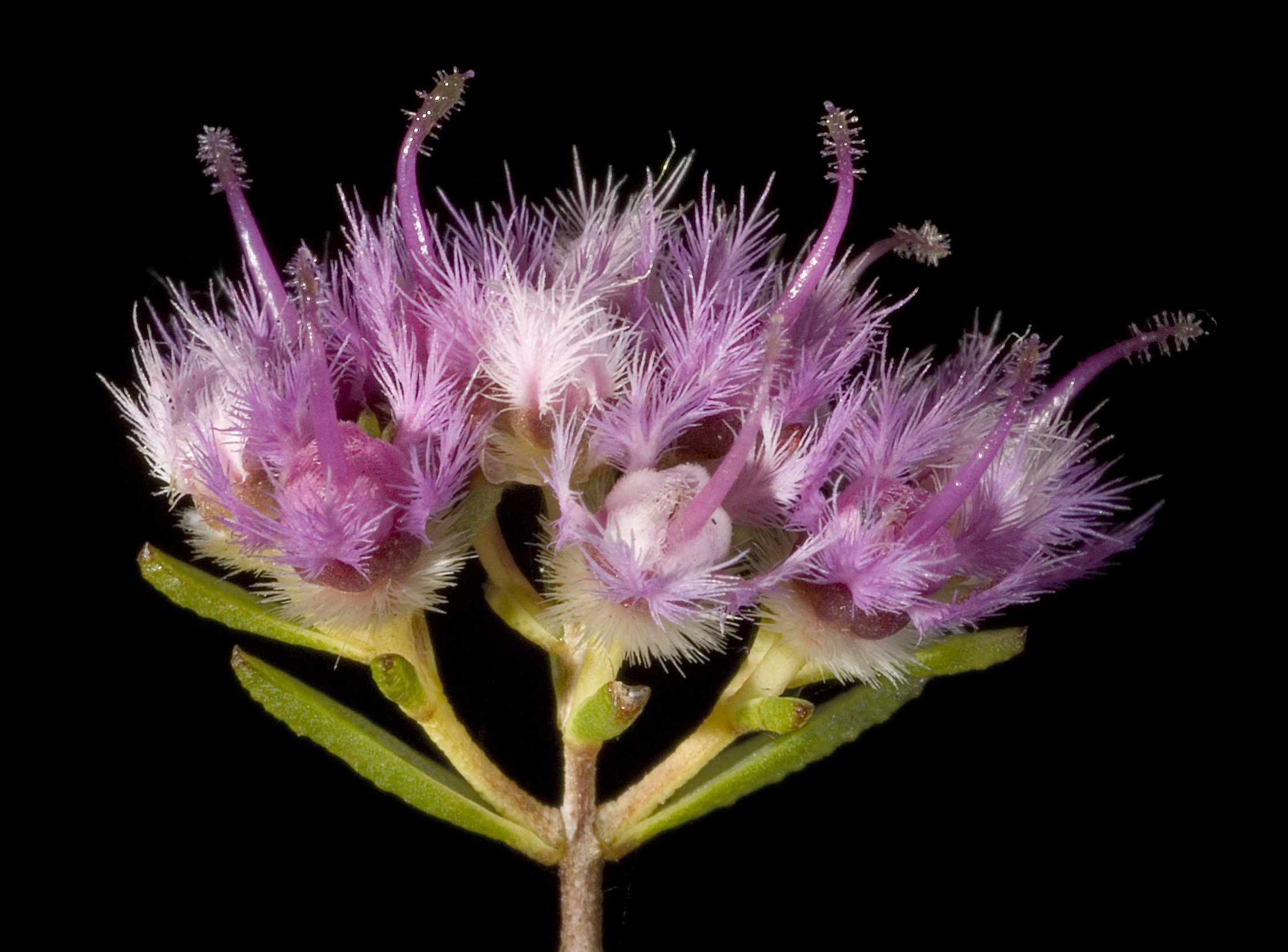

Scientific classification
- Kingdom: Plantae
- Clade: Tracheophytes
- Clade: Angiosperms
- Clade: Eudicots
- Clade: Rosids
- Order: Myrtales
- Family: Myrtaceae
- Genus: Verticordia
- Species: V. densiflora Lindl.
- Variety: V. d. var. densiflora

Trinomial name
- Verticordia densiflora var. densiflora

= Verticordia densiflora var. densiflora =

Variety of flowering plant

Verticordia densiflora var. densiflora is a flowering plant in the myrtle family, Myrtaceae and is endemic to the south-west of Western Australia. It is a shrub with small leaves and pink or, occasionally white flowers. It is one of 5 varieties of the species Verticordia densiflora.

== Description ==
Verticordia densiflora var. densiflora is an openly branched shrub which grows to a height of 0.15–1.0 m (0.5–3 ft). The leaves vary in shape from linear to egg-shaped and those near the flowers are 0.8–1.3 mm (0.03–0.05 in) wide.

The flowers are scented and arranged in corymb-like groups on erect stalks from 1.5 to 2.5 mm (0.06 to 0.1 in) long. The floral cup is shaped like half a sphere, about 1.5 mm (0.06 in) long, smooth but hairy near its base. The sepals are pale pink, to very dark purplish pink and fade with age, or sometimes white. They are 2–3.5 mm (0.08–0.1 in) long, with 3 lobes which have a fringe of coarse hairs. The petals are a similar colour to the sepals, 0.8–1.9 mm (0.03–0.07 in) long, egg-shaped with many filaments on their ends. The style is 5–6 mm (0.20–0.24 in) long, extending beyond the petals and is curved and hairy. Flowering occurs from September to February.

== Taxonomy and naming ==
Verticordia densiflora was first formally described by John Lindley in 1839 and the description was published in A Sketch of the Vegetation of the Swan River Colony. In 1991, Alex George undertook a review of the genus Verticordia and described five varieties of Verticordia densiflora including this variety.

== Distribution and habitat ==
This variety of V. densiflora grows in sand, often associated with granite in heath, shrubland or woodland and is widespread from Geraldton in the north to Bremer Bay and Busselton in the south and eastwards towards the Wongan Hills. It occurs in the Avon Wheatbelt, Esperance Plains, Geraldton Sandplains, Jarrah Forest, Mallee and Swan Coastal Plain biogeographic regions.

== Conservation ==
Verticordia densiflora var. densiflora is classified as "not threatened" by the Western Australian Government Department of Parks and Wildlife.

== Use in horticulture ==
This variety is well established in gardens where it often produces honey-perfumed flowers from November to March. It has grown well in both summer- and winter-rainfall areas in a wide range of soils, producing more flowers when grown in full sun but deeper colours in part shade. It has been successfully propagated from seed, from cuttings and by grafting onto Darwinia citriodora rootstock.
