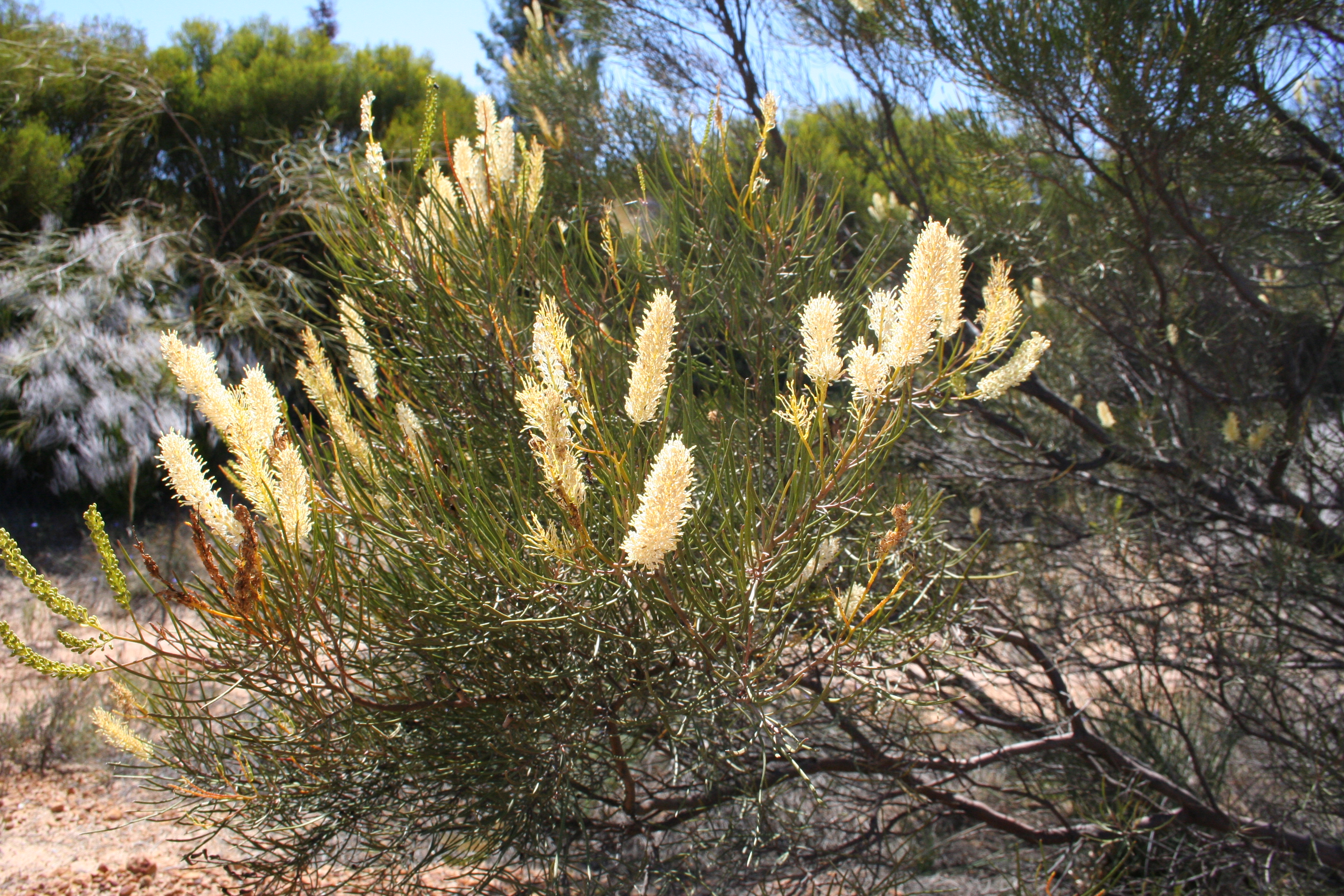

Conservation status
- Least Concern (IUCN 3.1)

Scientific classification
- Kingdom: Plantae
- Clade: Embryophytes
- Clade: Tracheophytes
- Clade: Spermatophytes
- Clade: Angiosperms
- Clade: Eudicots
- Order: Proteales
- Family: Proteaceae
- Genus: Grevillea
- Species: G. biformis

Binomial name
- Grevillea biformis Meisn.

Synonyms
- Grevillea integrifolia subsp. biformis (Meisn.) McGill.

= Grevillea biformis =

Species of shrub endemic to Western Australia

Grevillea biformis is a species of flowering plant in the family Proteaceae and is endemic to the south-west of Western Australia. It is a shrub with linear leaves and cylindrical clusters of creamy white or pale pink flowers.

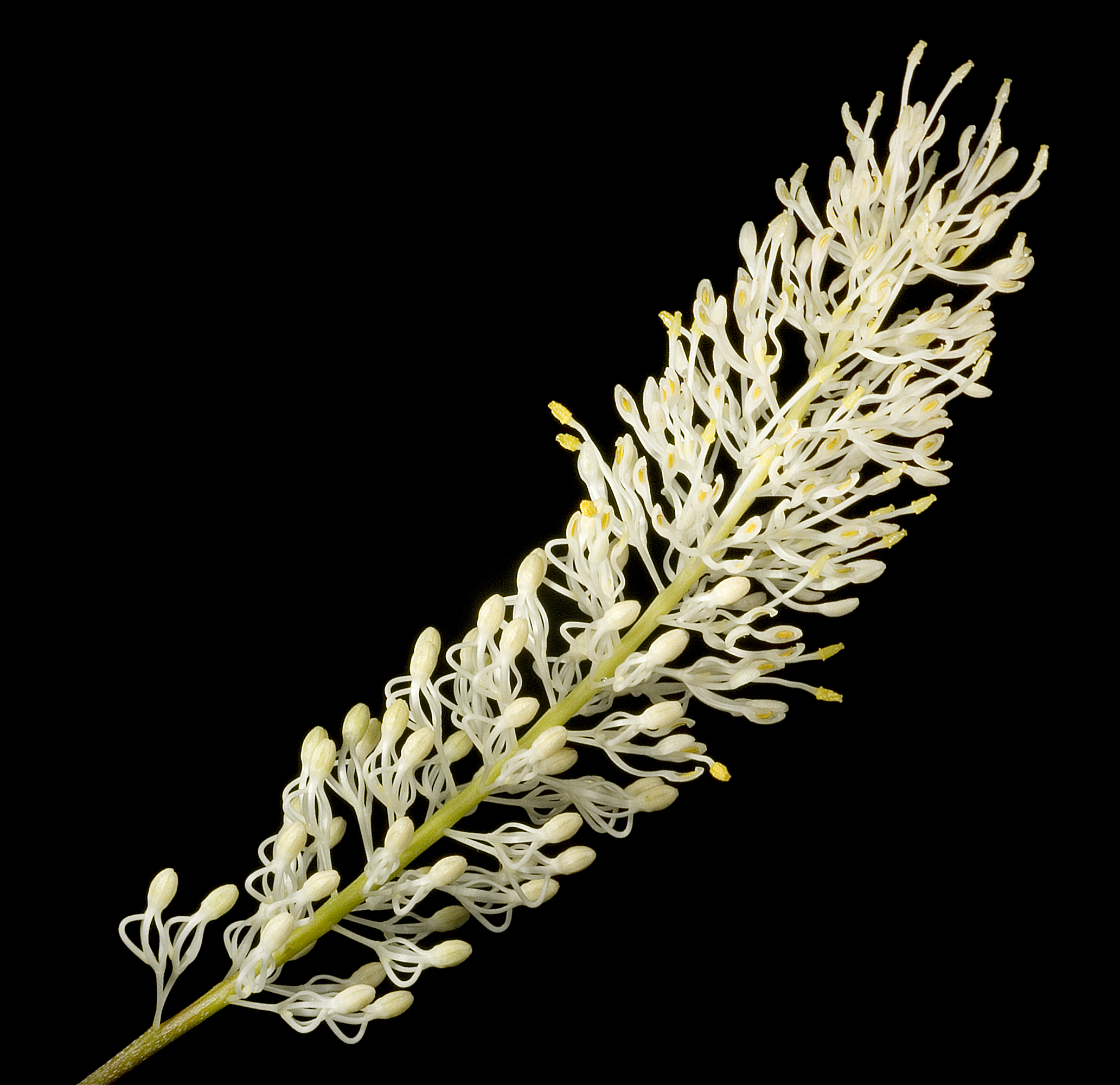
Inflorescence detail subsp. biformis

== Description ==
Grevillea biformis is a shrub that typically grows to a height of 1.5–2.5 m (4 ft 11 in – 8 ft 2 in), its foliage covered with silky hairs. The adult leaves are linear, juvenile leaves egg-shaped with the narrower end towards the base, 30–160 mm (1.2–6.3 in) long and 1–12 mm (0.039–0.472 in) wide. The flowers are arranged in cylindrical groups 40–130 mm (1.6–5.1 in) long and are pale creamy white, rarely pale pink and the pistil is 5.5–8.5 mm (0.22–0.33 in) long. Flowering occurs from January to March or from August to December and the fruit is a narrowly oval follicle 7–13 mm (0.28–0.51 in) long.

== Taxonomy ==
Grevillea biformis was first formally described in 1848 by Carl Meissner in Johann Georg Christian Lehmann's Plantae Preissianae The specific epithet (biformis) means "two-leaved", referring to the two forms of leaves of this species.

In 1994, Peter M. Olde and Neil R. Marriott described two subspecies and the names are accepted by the Australian Plant Census:

- Grevillea biformis Meisn. subsp. biformis has leaves 50–150 mm (2.0–5.9 in) long and 1–2 mm (0.039–0.079 in) wide;
- Grevillea biformis subsp. cymbiformis Olde & Marriott has leaves 30–55 mm (1.2–2.2 in) long and 2–9 mm (0.079–0.354 in) wide.

== Distribution and habitat ==
This grevillea grows in a variety of habitats from sandplain to mallee and is widespread in the south-west of Western Australia from near Shark Bay to Lake Grace and Hyden. Subspecies cymbiformis grows in low heath and is restricted to a small area near Eneabba.

== Conservation status ==
Grevillea biformis is listed as not threatened by the Department of Biodiversity, Conservation and Attractions, but subsp. cymbiformis is classified as priority three, meaning that it is poorly known and known from only a few locations but is not under imminent threat. It is also listed as least concern on the IUCN Red List of Threatened Species.
