= Richard Helms (naturalist) =

German-born Australian nautralist (1842–1914)

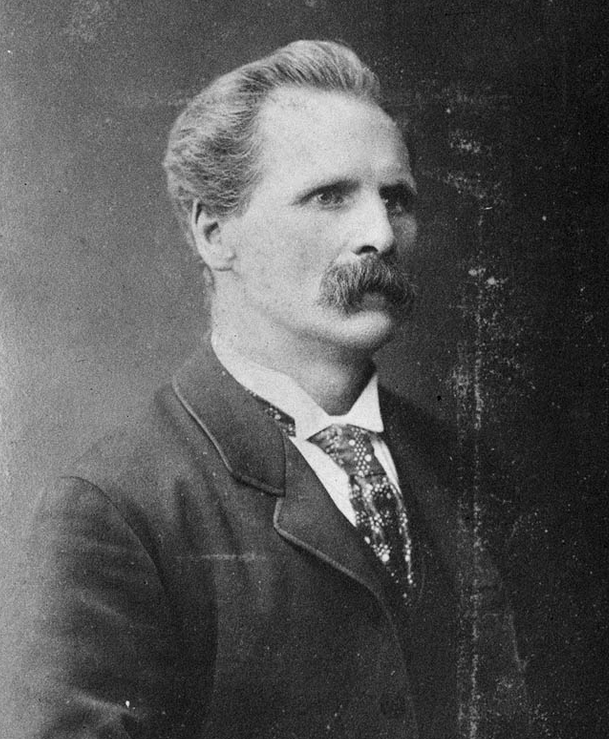
- Richard Helms, botanist to the 1891 Elder Exploring Expedition
- Born: 12 December 1842
- Died: 14 July 1914 (aged 71)
- Occupation: naturalist
- Known for: botany, zoology, geology, and ethnology in various parts of Australia and New Zealand

Richard Helms (12 December 1842 – 7 July 1914) was a German-born Australian naturalist whose work in botany, zoology, geology, and ethnology covered various parts of Australia and New Zealand. He arrived in Australia in 1858 and worked for a cousin in a Melbourne cigar shop. He travelled to Dunedin, New Zealand, in 1862 and in 1876 began practicing as a dentist in Nelson, New Zealand. He married in 1879 and opened a watchmaking business in Greymouth. The standard author abbreviation Helms is used to indicate this person as the author when citing a botanical name.
