= 2015 Esperance bushfires =

Bushfires in Western Australia

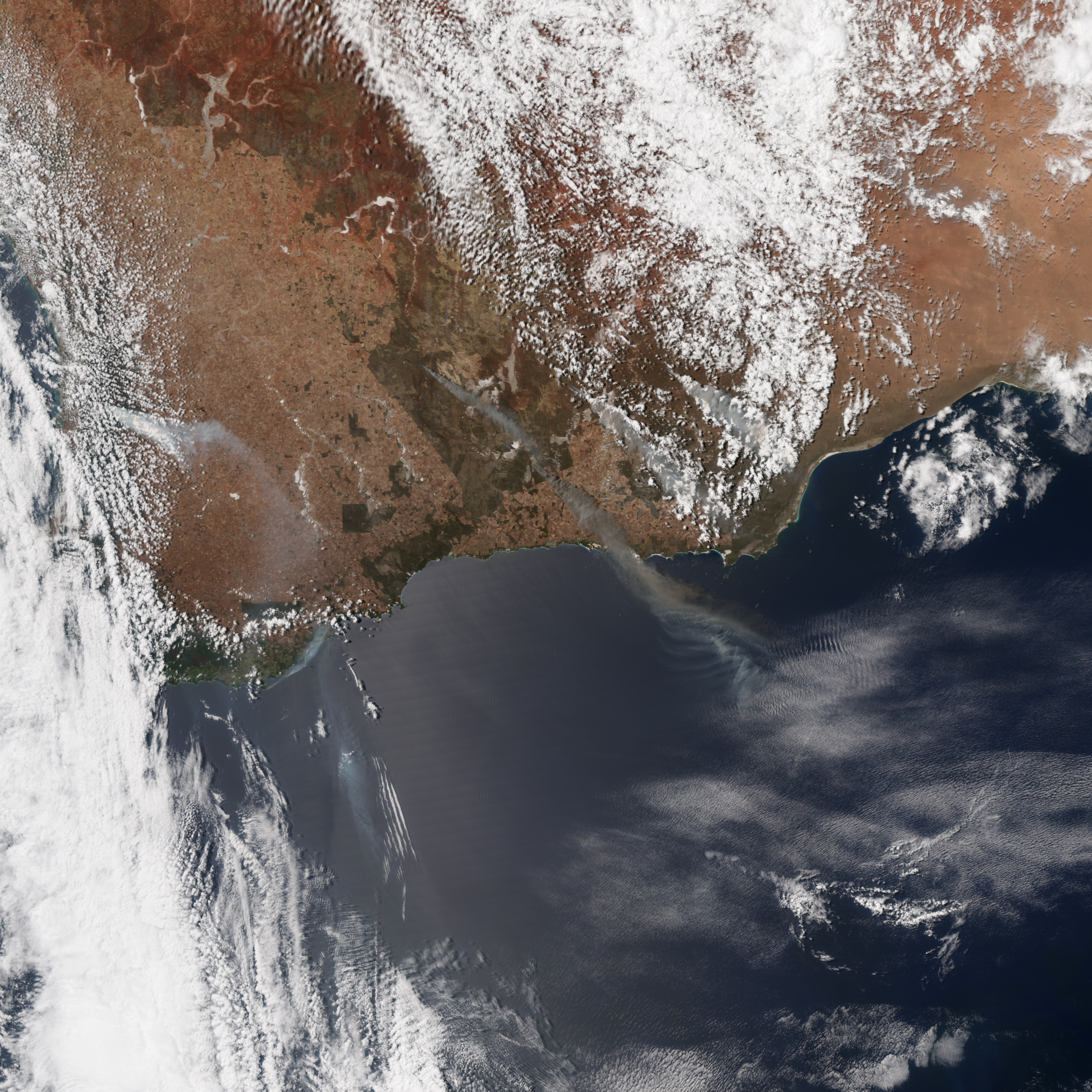
- View of the Esperance fires from NASA's Suomi NPP, using Visible Infrared Imaging Radiometer Suite (VIIRS) imagery on 17 November.
- Date: 15 – 26 November
- Location: Shire of Esperance
- Coordinates: 33°6′21″S 120°59′2″E (approximate ignition point of Cascades fire)

Statistics
- Burned area: More than 310,000 hectares (766,000 acres)
- Land use: Residential; Farmland; Forest reserves

Impacts
- Deaths: 4
- Structures destroyed: — 3 houses — 16 non-residential buildings
- Cost: A$60–150 million

Ignition
- Cause: Lightning

The 2015 Esperance bushfires were a series of catastrophic bushfires that burned from 15 to 26 November and affected the Goldfields-Esperance region in the Australian state of Western Australia. During the fires, the Shire of Esperance experienced two significant fires and a complex of fires; 128,000 hectares (320,000 acres) were burnt by the Cascades fire, 18,000 hectares (44,000 acres) were burnt by the Merivale fire, and 164,000 hectares (410,000 acres) were burnt by the Cape Arid complex of fires. On 17 November, during the major run of the Cascades fire, four civilian fatalities occurred in vehicles traveling on Griggs Road in Scaddan. As of 2020, the Cascades fire was equally the worst bushfire in Western Australia in terms of human fatalities along with the Willow Springs/Nannup fire of January 1958.

The Cascades fire destroyed Scaddan town hall, one house, 16 non-residential structures and dozens of vehicles in the communities of Grass Patch, Salmon Gums and Scaddan. There was also significant damage to rural produce; approximately 4,500 head of livestock died and 30,000 hectares (74,000 acres) of crop—constituting about 500,000 tonnes of grain—were burnt. In addition, the Merivale fire destroyed two houses in Stockyard Creek, and the Cape Arid complex destroyed significant areas of western ground parrot habitat—reportedly up to 90%—prompting discussion that the critically endangered parrot could "... become the first bird in at least 200 years to become extinct in Western Australia".

== Background ==
Agriculture is the predominant land use by area in the Shire of Esperance; between 1990 and 2000 the region witnessed an increase of 50% in the total cropped area and a decrease in the total area dedicated to livestock farming, the main crops produced are wheat, barley and canola. Cropped areas are particularly combustible prior to harvest, and stubble is retained post harvest to reduce soil erosion, which maintains a combustible ground cover and increases fuel load in pre-harvest fields.

The Esperance region had above average winter rainfall in 2015, promoting the growth of large quantities of crops and other plant material. Salmon Gums Research Station, 100 kilometres (62 mi) north of Esperance town, reported its highest winter rainfall in 88 years; 91.2 millimetres (3.59 in) fell in August, the highest August total rainfall for at least 30 years. Prior to the 2015 harvest, yields of up to 5 tonnes per hectare (Note: The yield was significantly higher than the average of 1–2 tonnes per hectare recorded in Western Australia most years between 2005 and 2014.) were reported in the Esperance district, which was estimated to be around 50% harvested at the time of the fires. This represented a 2015 harvest that was far above the 5 year average, even accounting for the "... hundreds of thousands of tonnes" of grain lost during the fire.

The winter rains were followed by an unusually dry and warm spring, which rapidly dried out the unharvested crops and other plant material. Statewide average temperatures in Western Australia during October were +3.28 °C above average and the highest on record, and rainfall was generally light across the Esperance region at 6–8 millimetres (0.24–0.31 in). Temperature observations were similarly elevated in November, at +1.78 °C above average and the second warmest on record.

=== Predictions for the 2015–16 bushfire season ===
A strengthening El Niño–Southern Oscillation event across the Pacific Ocean and the warmer waters associated with the Indian Ocean Dipole, was expected to increase the severity and duration of the 2015–16 fire season in Western Australia, with the Goldfields-Esperance region in particular to experience "above normal fire potential" due to high fuel loads.

== Fire timeline ==
=== 14–16 November ===
Over the weekend of 14–15 November, a trough system consisting of numerous thunderstorms moved in an easterly direction over southern Western Australia and lightning ignited fires across a large area. At least 40 fires were recorded by the Department of Fire and Emergency Services (DFES) on 15 November, including the Cascades fire, the Merivale fire, and the Cape Arid complex, which constituted three of the ten incidents recorded by the DFES in the Shire of Esperance.

The Cascades fire ignited north of Pyramid Rd. and west of Ned's Corner Rd. on unallocated crown land south of Lake Mends in the North Cascades area. Lightning from the same storm system also ignited the Merivale fire in the vicinity of Doombup Lake and Mullet Lake, 20 kilometres (12 mi) east of Esperance town, and the Cape Arid complex of fires in the Gypsum Mine, Mount Ragged, and Thomas River areas of the northern part of Cape Arid National Park.

The fires remained uncontained by dawn on 16 November and a bushfire advice message for North Cascade was issued by the DFES at 11:30 AWST (UTC+08:00), although there was no threat to lives or homes at the time. Winds in the Cascades fire ground on 16 November were light to fresh breezes to from the south-south-east and relative humidity ranged from approximately 25–55%; conditions favourable to containment. However, by the end of the day on 16 November, both the Cascades and Merivale fire remained uncontained and residents of 7 properties near the Merivale fire were advised to leave.

At a briefing by the Bureau of Meteorology to the DFES on 16 November, a McArthur Forest Fire Danger Index (FFDI) rating of 250–260 was reportedly forecast for 17 November; described as "... worse than the day of the Black Saturday bushfires in Victoria that claimed 173 lives and injured some 5000 people". Despite fears for the escalation of the fire in the forecast conditions, which greatly exceeded the threshold for "catastrophic" (an FFDI of 100), all three fires remained at the classification of "Level 1" and therefore under the control of local brigades. (Note: A "Level 1" incident is characterized by being within the scope of local government and local brigades to respond to and manage, having a low level of complexity and a relatively minor impact on the community.) Following the fires, Deputy Commissioner of the DFES, Lloyd Bailey, stated that on 16 November;

People in the area were advised to put their survival first and leave the night before or early in the day if possible, and that it was not safe to stay and defend their homes.

=== 17 November ===
The passage of a low pressure system over the south-west of the state created winds of moderate gale to storm force from the north to west over the Shire of Esperance and all three fire zones, elevating the temperature to over 40 °C (104 °F) across most of the shire. An extremely low relative humidity of 6% was observed at the Salmon Gums Research Station at 15:00 AWST, and a "storm force" wind gust of 93 kilometres per hour (58 mph) from the west-north-west was recorded at 15:37 AWST. Winds were consistently 50–60 kilometres per hour (31–37 mph) during the afternoon, with frequent gusts up to 70–80 kilometres per hour (43–50 mph).

As anticipated, the Esperance region experienced catastrophic fire weather conditions on the afternoon of 17 November; McArthur Grassland Fire Danger Index (FFDI) recordings of 175 and 180—significantly above the threshold of 100 for "catastrophic" conditions—were recorded at Scaddan and Cascades respectively. FFDI ratings of up to 221 were reportedly observed elsewhere around Esperance. This resulted in an escalation of all three fires, including the major run of the Cascades fire.

As early as 06:30 AWST, farmers made calls to fire authorities with concerns about the height of flames in inaccessible areas close to properties in and around Cascades, as the fire front expanded to at least 5 kilometres (3.1 mi). During the morning, the Cascades and Merivale fires caused power outages in Esperance shire that affected at least 300 customers and also stopped mobile phone coverage. Just prior to midday the Cascades fire jumped across fuel modification breaks—consisting of substantial pre-existing scrub rolling and other fuel treatment—on the interface of crown land and private property. The fire moved rapidly once it had entered private property; during its major south–east run on the afternoon of 17 November, the Cascades fire is estimated to have spread at a rate of 15–23 kilometres per hour (9.3–14.3 mph), fueled by the heavy harvest fuel loads, and to have traveled approximately 70 kilometres (43 mi) over a five-hour period. The Cascades fire is estimated to have reached a peak intensity of around 45,000kW/h, described in the Major Incident Report as;

... the hottest grassland fire in WA's recorded history, and possibly in Australia's recorded history.

At 13:10 AWST the DFES warning for the Cascades fire was upgraded to "watch and act", and the warning was reported by the Experance Express within the hour, however an "emergency warning" was not issued for the fire until 17:50 AWST, some two hours after the fire impacted Griggs Rd., 50–60 kilometres (31–37 mi) from the point of ignition. All four civilians fatalities from the Cascades fire occurred at approximately 15:50 AWST, when the fire front impacted Griggs Rd. between Cascade and Scaddan.

The Cascades fire crossed the Coolgardie–Esperance Highway at approximately 17:50 AWST and impacted the community of Scaddan, where the majority of structural damage occurred. The DFES superintendent for Goldfields-Esperance, Trevor Tasker, witnessed the fire front impacting the highway and created a road block, preventing an estimated 100 cars—containing approximately 200 tourists and locals—from driving into the flames; police in Norseman prevented traffic entering the area impacted by fire from the opposite direction. Scaddan farmer Chris Reichstein used a speed tiller (Note: A speed tiller, sometimes called a disc plow, is designed to remove stubble and weeds by mulching the organic material and burying it.) to cut a firebreak several meters wide through burning crops and stubble along the eastern edge of the fire front, preventing the fire front from crossing into bushland where it "... could have burned for weeks".

Ninety minutes after the fire front had traversed the highway and impacted Scaddan township, the fire was upgraded to "Level 3", a designation that effectively grants the DFES command and control of the incident. (Note: A "Level 3" incident is characterized by being protracted, large and resource intensive. They typically require significant coordination of multi-agency resources—usually by the DFES—and have a high level of complexity and community impact.) By mid–evening, between 100 and 150 people from Scaddan and Grass Patch had evacuated to Salmon Gums Recreation Centre, and at approximately 22:00 AWST the area under threat was expanded to include Red Lake and Salmon Gums.

On 17 November, the Merivale fire also moved rapidly in a south–east direction, and DFES warnings were upgraded to "watch and act" level at 11:55 AWST. Fire conditions peaked during the afternoon, with the Esperance station recording an astonishingly low relative humidity of 2% at 15:00 AWST and a wind gust of 83 kilometres per hour (52 mph) from the west-north-west at 16:12 AWST. A wind change shifted the direction of fire spread to north–east at approximately 18:00 AWST, and an "emergency" warning was issued at 21:04 AWST, after the fire had crossed Cape Le Grand Rd. Two houses were destroyed in the Stockyard Creek area during the night. The ability of crews to control the Merivale fire was hampered by the vegetation and the varying terrain in the area, which included swamps, lakes and dune systems as well as several blue gum plantations.

=== 18–26 November ===
Winds in the Cascades fire ground on 18 November again returned to gentle to moderate breezes from the north to west and relative humidity ranged from approximately 30–40%. Although no rainfall was recorded until 24 November, the low winds and temperatures of 25–32 °C (77–90 °F) meant that the Cascades fire was largely stationary and the Merivale fire was spreading slowly, yet erratically. Four single-engine air tankers were deployed to control the Merivale fire.

At approximately midday on 19 November, the warning for the Cascade fire was once again upgraded to emergency level for the areas west of the Coolgadie-Esperance Highway in the communities of Grass Patch and Salmon Gums. The warning was downgraded to "watch and act" at approximately 15:00 AWST with no further injury or serious damage to property, although the perimeter of the fire had expanded to 214 kilometres (133 mi). By 20 November 300 people had evacuated from the communities impacted by the Cascades fire. Residential areas were again threatened by the Merivale fire on 21–22 November, when it broke containment lines under the influence of a wind change.

An "all clear" message was issued for both the Cascades and Merivale fires on the afternoon of 25 November, indicating that the series of fires were essentially extinguished. The Esperance District complex of fires was downgraded to "Level 1" and the DFES transitioned control for the recovery effort of the Cascades and Merivale fires to Local Government, and the recovery effort for the Cape Arid complex of fires was transferred to the Department of Parks and Wildlife (DPAW) on 26 November.

== Aftermath ==
=== Fatalities ===
The four civilians who died in the Cascades fire were identified on 19 November.

- Julia Kohrs-Lichte, 19, of Germany — Kohrs-Lichte was working at Karranga Station.
- Anna Winther, 29, of Norway — Winther was a graduate of Curtin University and an activist for Amnesty International, who was working as a cook at Karranga Station.
- Thomas Butcher, 31, of Britain — Butcher, a mechanical fitter, had resided in Australia for the four years prior and was working at Karranga Station.
- Kym Curnow, 45, of Australia — Curnow was a father-of-three and farmer in the Esperance-region, who was also an Officer of the Scaddan Volunteer Bush Fire Brigade.

The three foreign nationals, who had been staying at Karranga farm on 17 November, died in the same vehicle while fleeing to Esperance town. The bodies were discovered in a vehicle with a horse float, containing the remains of the horse "Cougar", only a few kilometres from the property the trio were working at. Curnow also died in his vehicle while driving door-to-door to warn neighbours about the approaching fire front. Curnow was described in the media as a "hero" for his efforts to assist others, and his funeral was attended by up to four thousand people.

=== Structural damage ===
The Cascades fire destroyed the Scaddan town hall, one house, 16 other non-residential structures and dozens of vehicles in the communities of Grass Patch, Salmon Gums and Scaddan. In addition, the Merivale fire destroyed two houses in Stockyard Creek. Roads and utilities infrastructure was also damaged within the fire ground; the destruction of 320 power poles and hundreds of kilometres of power lines caused a week long power outage for 400–500 residents in the region. The series of fires did not reach the Insurance Council of Australia (ICA) threshold for insurance emergency because infrastructure losses were not particularly extensive.

=== Agricultural damage ===
The fires caused significant damage to rural produce and the harvest was delayed for at least a week as grains handler CBH Group closed its Esperance grain terminal and shut six grain storage sites. In some areas, the topsoil had reportedly been stripped, leaving nothing but sandy plains. Approximately 4,500 head of livestock died and 30,000 hectares (74,000 acres) of crop—constituting an estimated 500,000 tonnes of grain—were destroyed by both the fire and the strong north-westerly winds experienced on 17 November. The winds resulted in significant yield loss due to pod shatter in canola and head loss (Note: Head loss is when the straw of plants may remain standing but breakage immediately under the head occurs and the heads fall to the ground, reducing grain yields.) in both barley and wheat; barley head loss in the order of 1.5 to over 2 tonnes per hectare was observed in many areas of Esperance shire.

A forecast yield of over 3 million tonnes was reduced to 2.5 million, with wheat comprising the majority of produce lost in the fires and winds; the destruction of produce is thought to have cost the region up to A$150 million. A survey of the impacted area by a satellite that provides imagery to Landgate, revealed that 200,000 tonnes of vegetation from agricultural areas was removed by the fires. Further agricultural loss was expected in the coming harvests as a result of soil erosion; to mitigate the damage done, as soon as the remaining crops had been harvested, paddocks were scarified and barley and maize were sown as cover crops. Over 2000ha at point of harvest plantation blue gums were destroyed or damaged. Value $US 60 million. Major woodchip exporters in Australia will not purchase and export woodchips from fire damaged plantations.

=== Environmental damage ===
The Cape Arid complex of fires destroyed significant areas—reportedly up to 90%—of the remaining Western Ground Parrot habitat within Cape Arid National Park. Much of the habitat had already been burned by a bushfire in Cape Arid National Park during October of the same year. Prior to the fires, there were believed to be only 140 individual parrots living in the wild, and the number was estimated to have been reduced to only 30–40 as a result of the damage caused by the fires. The widespread destruction of dense vegetation the ground-dwelling birds rely on for nesting prompted discussion that the critically endangered parrot could "... become the first bird in at least 200 years to become extinct in Western Australia". Two parrots—a male and a female—were rescued from the Cape Arid fire ground and taken to Perth Zoo for inclusion in a captive breeding program, however both birds died in captivity.

=== Aid and relief ===
On 21 November, the Minister for Justice, Michael Keenan, and the Premier of Western Australia, Colin Barnett, jointly announced that disaster assistance pursuant to the Commonwealth-State Natural Disaster Relief and Recovery Arrangements (NDRRA) had been activated for those affected by fire in the Shire of Esperance. Victims were eligible for personal hardship and distress assistance, personal and financial counselling, interest rate subsidies for small businesses and primary producers, and freight subsidies for primary producers.

The lord mayor of the City of Perth established a "Lord Mayor's Distress Relief Fund" to accept donations that would be distributed to the victims of the fires; donations to the fund included $250,000 from CBH Group, $100,000 from the WA state government, $25,000 from Bankwest, $25,000 from Aurizon, and $10,000 from the City of Bunbury. Over A$1 million was raised by the appeal.

== Criticism of authorities and subsequent incident reviews ==
Following the fires, state and federal representatives, the community, and a review commissioned by the DFES identified shortcomings including, but not limited to;

- Failures of telecommunications and radio infrastructure.
- Issues surrounding fire mitigation and suppression, especially in the areas of resource allocation.
- Difficulty mobilizing and managing emergency and administrative staff in a remote area.
- Issues with staffing, organization and coordination, within and between, the DFES, DPAW, Department of Lands (DoL), Volunteer Bush Fire Brigades (BFB), Volunteer Fire and Rescue Service (VFRS), local governments, and the public.

Following the 2016 Waroona–Yarloop bushfire, the Government of Western Australia announced a public inquiry into the response to the Harvey-Waroona bushfire. (Note: A special inquiry pursuant to section 24H(2) and (3) of the Public Sector Management Act 1994 to examine the organisation and management of the bushfire in the Waroona area in January 2016. Euan Ferguson AFSM was appointed to undertake the role of Special Inquirer.) However, the Esperance bushfires were omitted from the terms of reference, prompting criticism from the Association of Volunteer Bushfire Brigades, the Emergency Services Volunteer Association, the State Emergency Services Volunteer Association and WA Farmers; the group of organizations issued a joint statement discussing serious concerns about the scope of the inquiry. A Major Incident Report (MIR) was, however, compiled by the consultancy firm Nous Group for the DFES and released on 8 March 2016.

=== Telecommunications and radio ===
Mobile phone reception in the communities impacted by the fires was poor before the fires, and added pressure on the network during the emergency caused significant issues, including motorists being unaware of the risks in certain areas and inadvertently driving into the paths of the fires. Numerous property owners described only being notified after the fire had passed through their properties, and the reliance on word-of-mouth communication is thought to have contributed to the death of Curnow, who died while driving to inform others of the Cascades fire. During the morning power outage in the Cascades fire zone, twenty-one Telstra sites—four mobile phone towers and seventeen exchange and connectivity points—switched to battery power; the batteries were designed to last eight hours before being replaced by generators, however Telstra staff could not access the sites because of road blocks, resulting in a lack of mobile coverage for hours or days in some areas.

Due to the failure of the Cascades radio repeater, reliable radio communications could not be ensured during the response to the fire. An absence of portable or back–up repeaters meant there was no redundancy in the radio infrastructure system of the Esperance region, and therefore no workarounds available in the event of infrastructure not being functional. These failures were compounded by radio congestion. Esperance shire had two channel systems intended for use during incidents; the BFB network and the DFES command network, however the DFES command network was not able to be used during the initial days of the incident, or 17 November major runs by the fires, due to a faulty antenna.

In response to the failures during the fires, the construction of two mobile phone towers—in the Grass Patch and Salmon Gums townships respectively—was expedited by the Shire of Esperance in early December 2015. The electorate of O'Connor, in which the impacted communities are located, also received up to A$54 million as part of a federal mobile blackspots program. (Note: As part of "Round 1" of the Mobile Black Spot Programme, the Commonwealth Government committed A$100 million, supplemented by A$32 million from the Government of Western Australia, to deliver 499 new and upgraded mobile base stations across Australia; 130 of which were in WA.)

=== Fire mitigation ===
Following the fires, access to unallocated crown land (UCL) and reserves to perform bushfire mitigation emerged as a key issue for local landholders, who sought the ability to prepare and maintain permanent firebreaks in bushland bordering farming properties. At the time of the fires, the DoL had administrative responsibility for UCL and Unmanaged Reserves in Western Australia, however fire mitigation, such as hazard reduction burning, was performed by the DFES within townsites and performed by the DPAW outside townsites, excluding locals from access to assist and manage fuel loads.

In 2014–15, statewide funding for the DoL to undertake fire mitigation, weed and feral animal control, and harvesting of flora and forest produce was approximately A$1.5 million, of which around A$1 million was spent on fire–related activities. During the same period, DPAW conducted prescribed burns across 147,082 hectares (363,450 acres) in the South-West region, well below their target of 200,000 hectares (490,000 acres). Fuel age in the areas burned by the Merivale fire was estimated to be about seven years, as a result of a number of prescribed burns since 2000, however the fuel age of the UCL burned in the Cascades fire was estimated to be significantly older, at up to 20 years. As part of its fire mitigation strategy in 2009–10, DPAW had performed scrub rolling and burning of pre-existing buffers at the interface of UCL where the Cascades fire ignited and private property. However, constraints on time and resources meant that only 5 kilometres (3.1 mi) of the interface was burned, of which a mere 1 kilometre (0.62 mi) turned out to be in the eventual path of the fire.

The authority of farmers to clear and manage land—particularly areas designated UCL—was a "... contentious issue" in the Esperance area, and several landholders were prosecuted for clearing land in contravention the state regulations. Landholders offered to enter the UCL where the Cascades fire ignited and use graders to contain the fire before the catastrophic conditions on 17 November, however the regulations and administrative bureaucracy concerning UCL prevented them from doing so. Mick Fels, the WA Farmers Esperance-Ravensthorpe zone president and an Esperance-area farmer whose property borders a reserve, described to the ABC his experience advocating for "... two or three years, at every level, to get DPAW to put a firebreak against [his] boundary fence ..." however his efforts were "... unsuccessful". Fels hoped to see firebreak control and fuel reduction responsibilities transferred from DPAW and DFES, and back to local communities.

The fuel load on private property before the fires was described as "... enormous", with wheat crops ranging from 4–5 tonnes per hectare; Esperance-region families who had been "... farming this land for more than 100 years" described the 2015 harvest as "... the best crop ever." The yields marked a great increase from the 2 tonnes per hectare considered a "good crop" in the Esperance-region decades prior, and the Major Incident Report noted;

Changes in farming practices in the Esperance region have resulted in more widespread and higher yield cropping areas, creating higher fuel loads across a larger area prior to harvest.

=== Fire suppression ===
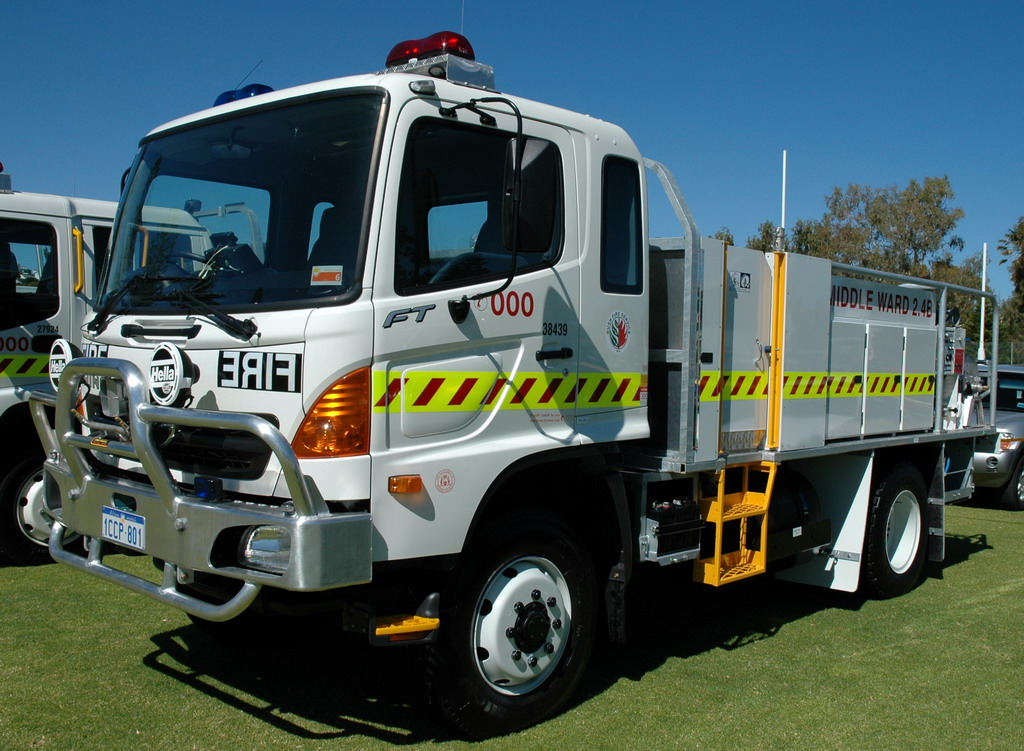
A Hino 2.4 Rural Tanker, one of the models used by Volunteer Bush Fire Brigades in rural Western Australia

At least 200 firefighters and volunteers from the BFB, DFES, DPAW, and VFRS assisted in fighting the fires during their 12-day duration. However, during the period of 15–17 November—immediately following the ignition of the fire and during its major run—only 4 DFES, DPAW and local government staff were on Incident Management Team (IMT) tasked with managing numerous brigades under the principles of the Australasian Inter–service Incident Management System (AIIMS). The chronic lack of IMT personnel in the Great Southern region in which Esperance is situated—only 18 DFES staff to manage 239 volunteer brigades and other emergency services units—is thought to have increased risk during the fires. Mark Wandel, a local farmer, described traveling 30–40 kilometres (19–25 mi) with other farmers to establish fire breaks and not witnessing "... any fire services people all day", stressing his concerns that fire authorities were "... stretched to the max".

Particular criticism from the community was reserved for the decisions surrounding the usage of aerial firefighting assets, such as helicopters and fixed-wing water-bombing aircraft. During a grievance debate on 7 April 2016, Dr. Graham Gibson Jacobs MP introduced before the WA Legislative Assembly his concerns about resource allocation, with particular focus on the absence of aerial support and the decision by the state operations centre that the Esperance area did not require additional resources in the face of the catastrophic conditions on 17 November. Aerial assistance for firefighters did not arrive until 18 November, as all available aerial assets—two fixed-wing water bombing aircraft—were deployed some 470 kilometres (290 mi) away in Albany in preparation for catastrophic conditions in that area of the region.

A pair of fixed-wing "crop spraying" agricultural aircraft operated by private contractors in the Esperance area were offered for aerial support suppression tasking; officially, regulatory constraints and contract management capacity prohibited their deployment. Comments by Liam Bartlett, printed in a 29 November PerthNow article, suggest that pilots may have been "... more than ready to take to the skies ..." however the pilots were "... threatened with a loss of license if they flew near the blaze ..." and therefore were not able to not assist. The nearest airstrip to the Cascades foreground was 50 kilometres (31 mi) south in Esperance township, and the MIR publication cast doubt over whether aerial suppression would have been effective in controlling the run of the Cascades fire in catastrophic conditions.

In addition, during a statement to the Commonwealth Senate on 25 November 2015, Hon. Senator Christopher Back discussed "... questions as to whether personnel were able to go into crown land reserves after the lightning strike had started the fires." The senator stated there was "... never a circumstance in which volunteer brigade members could not go into crown land owned by the Commonwealth to suppress, fight and mitigate major fires if life and property are at risk."

=== Recommendations ===
Although the MIR found that the fires were "broadly well managed" in the context of the challenging conditions, intensity of the fires and competing resource demands across the state, there were a number of examples of firefighting effort being "compromised" by organizational failures.

- An absence of protocols and discipline in the usage of the BFB radio channel, compounded by infrastructure constraints; Personnel had to book air time or break in over the top of communications, which often consisted of idle conversation between teams.
- The reliance on a physical "T card" system—not a digital system that automatically updates (such as GPS)—to map resources on the fire ground; movements of crews on the fireground must be communicated back to the control point to enable the placement of T cards to be updated, and therefore is susceptible to failure when communication is limited.
- A failure to appreciate the value of local knowledge about terrain, infrastructure and typical fire behaviour; a situation was reported where vehicles became bogged in areas known locally to be a risk and the inappropriate placement of control points and road blocks without consideration for the locally-known flow of road trains, resulting in the vehicles having great difficulty turning around.

== See also ==
- Bushfires in Australia
- List of Australian bushfire seasons
- List of disasters in Australia by death toll

== Bibliography ==
- Bureau of Meteorology (2015a). Monthly Weather Review - Australia; October 2015 (PDF). Melbourne, Victoria: Commonwealth of Australia.
- Bureau of Meteorology (2015b). Monthly Weather Review - Australia; November 2015 (PDF). Melbourne, Victoria: Commonwealth of Australia.
- Nous Group (8 March 2016). Major Incident Review of the Esperance District fires (PDF). Perth, Western Australia: Department of Fire and Emergency Services.
