= List of State Register of Heritage Places in the Shire of Esperance =

The State Register of Heritage Places is maintained by the Heritage Council of Western Australia. As of 2026, 92 places are heritage-listed in the Shire of Esperance, of which twelve are on the State Register of Heritage Places.

== List ==
The Western Australian State Register of Heritage Places, as of 2026, lists the following twelve state registered places within the Shire of Esperance:

Place name	Place #	Street number	Street name	Suburb or town	Co-ordinates	Notes & former names	Photo
Dempster Homestead (former), Esperance	822	155	Dempster Street	Esperance	33.868961°S 121.889027°E		
R.S.L. Building / RSL Headquarters	825	84	Dempster Street	Esperance	33.860116°S 121.892916°E	Original School, Road Board, Public Library, Esperance School	
Bijou Theatre	828	115	Dempster Street	Esperance	33.864776°S 121.890194°E	RAOB Hall (former), (Royal Antediluvian Order of Buffaloes)	
Tanker Jetty, Esperance	831	Adjacent	The Esplanade & Norseman Road	Esperance	33.85427°S 121.907429°E	Second Jetty, Tanker Berth, New Jetty (name used between 1935-1965)	
Israelite Bay Post and Telegraph Station	836			Israelite Bay	33.622277°S 123.860672°E		
Moir Homestead Ruins	3540		Stokes National Park, Fanny Bay	Coomalbidgup	33.839447°S 121.177665°E	Moir's Fanny Cove Homestead	
Lynburn Homestead and Shearing Shed (former)	4216		Merivale Road	Boyatup	33.800275°S 123.034841°E	Lyndburn Station, Thomas River Station Homestead	
Norfolk Pine Trees	5054		Andrew & Dempster Streets	Esperance	33.860441°S 121.892316°E		
Esperance Fish Cannery (former)	5056	Lot 1018	Norseman Road	Chadwick	33.85041°S 121.900497°E	Youth Centre, Old Cannery Arts Centre/Hunts Cannery	
Salmon Gums Research Station	16599	1663	Machens Road	Salmon Gums	32.986669°S 121.621877°E	Salmon Gums Experimental Farm	
Esperance RSL Building, Norfolk Island Pine Trees and War Memorial	18402	84	Dempster Street	Esperance	33.860057°S 121.893077°E	Esperance Bay School, Municipal Chambers, Roads Board Office, Library	
Tree at Old Fish Cannery	23789	Lot 1018	Norseman Road	Chadwick	33.850215°S 121.90069°E		
