= Shark Lake, Western Australia =

Town in the Shire of Esperance, Western Australia

Shark Lake
- Town
- Interactive map of Shark Lake
- Coordinates: 33.77272°S 121.86343°E
- Country: Australia
- State: Western Australia
- LGA: Shire of Esperance
- Location: 664 km (413 mi) SE of Perth; 206 km (128 mi) SE of Norseman; 64 km (40 mi) E of Esperance
- Established: 1967

Government
  - State electorate: Roe
  - Federal division: O'Connor

Area
  - Total: 5.1 km^{2} (2.0 sq mi)
- Postcode: 6450

Shark Lake is a town in the Shire of Esperance in the Goldfields-Esperance region of Western Australia. It is situated within the localities of Monjingup and Myrup, on the Coolgardie-Esperance Highway. Shark Lake and the Shark Lake Nature Reserve surrounding it are located just north of the townsite.

The area around Shark Lake was set aside as a common reserve in 1898, being a stopping place on the route from Esperance to the Dundas goldfields. Located on the Norseman to Esperance railway, a siding was opened at Shark Lake in 1955. The townsite was gazetted in 1967 and named after the nearby lake but it is not known why a freshwater lake would be referred to as Shark Lake.

The townsite spreads over two localities, with the western part being in Monjingup and the eastern part in Myrup, the highway forming the boundary between the two. The Monjingup part of the townsite is larger than the Myrup one.
