= Acacia evenulosa =

Scientific classification
- Kingdom: Plantae
- Clade: Tracheophytes
- Clade: Angiosperms
- Clade: Eudicots
- Clade: Rosids
- Order: Fabales
- Family: Fabaceae
- Subfamily: Caesalpinioideae
- Clade: Mimosoid clade
- Genus: Acacia
- Species: A. evenulosa

Binomial name
- Acacia evenulosa Maslin
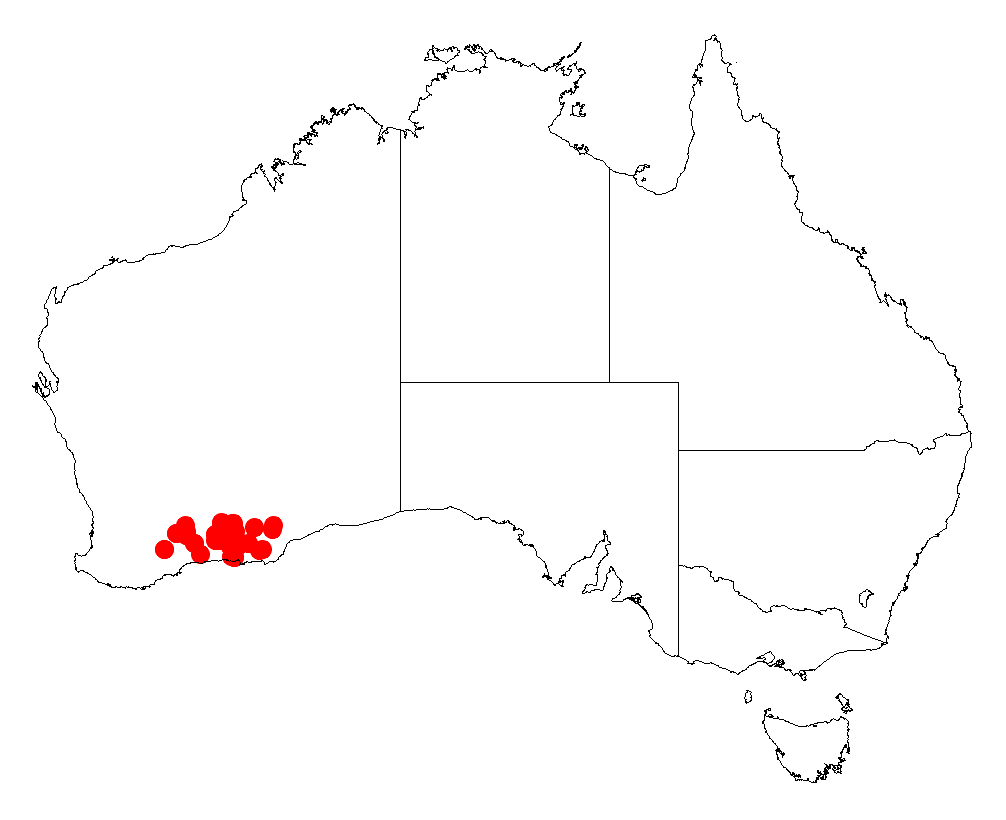
- Occurrence data from AVH

Synonyms
- Racosperma evenulosum (Maslin) Pedley

Species of legume

Acacia evenulosa is a species of flowering plant in the family Fabaceae and is endemic to the south of Western Australia. It is a dense, spreading shrub with hairy branchlets, erect, narrowly oblong to linear phyllodes on raised stem-projections, spherical heads of golden yellow flowers and more or less coiled pods.

== Description ==
Acacia evenulosa is a dense, spreading shrub that typically grows to a height of 0.5–1.7 m (1 ft 8 in – 5 ft 7 in) and has compressed branchlet at first, often with minute soft hairs towards the end and in the axils. The phyllodes are on raised stem-projections, erect, narrowly oblong to linear, often biconvex, 15–40 mm (0.59–1.57 in) long and 2–3.5 mm (0.079–0.138 in) wide. The phyllodes are leathery, glabrous, without a prominent midrib, the lateral veins absent or obscure. There are more or less persistent stipules 1.5–3 mm (0.059–0.118 in) long at the base of the phyllodes. The flowers are borne in two spherical heads in axils on a peduncle mostly 4–10 mm (0.16–0.39 in) long, each head 4.0–4.5 mm (0.16–0.18 in) in diameter with 15 to 22 golden yellow flowers. Flowering occurs in August and September, and the pods are commonly more or less coiled, up to 30 mm (1.2 in) long, 4.0–4.5 mm (0.16–0.18 in) wide, thinly leathery to crusty and glabrous. The seeds are broadly elliptic, 2.5 mm (0.098 in) long and glossy grey-brown to dark brown, with a linear to club-shaped aril near the end.

== Taxonomy ==
Acacia evenulosa was first formally described in 1999 by Bruce Maslin in the journal Nuytsia from specimens he collected 1 km (0.62 mi) north of Salmon Gums on the Coolgardie–Esperance Highway in 1983. The specific epithet (evenulosa)means 'lacking veinlets', referring to the obscure or absent lateral veins on the phyllodes.

== Distribution and habitat ==
This species of wattle grows on flats and undulating plains growing in sandy, clay, loamy or gravelly soils in low woodland, scrub mallee or low Casuarina scrub, in the Coolgardie, Esperance Plains and Mallee bioregions of southern Western Australia.

== Conservation status ==
Acacia evenulosa is listed as "not threatened" by the Government of Western Australia Department of Biodiversity, Conservation and Attractions.

== See also ==
- List of Acacia species
