= Monjingup, Western Australia =

Locality in the Shire of Esperance, Western Australia

Monjingup
- other
- Coordinates: 33.78821°S 121.76764°E
- Country: Australia
- State: Western Australia
- LGA(s): Shire of Esperance
- Location: 588 km (365 mi) SE of Perth; 173 km (107 mi) S of Norseman; 15 km (9.3 mi) NW of Esperance

Government
  - State electorate(s): Roe
  - Federal division(s): O'Connor

Area
  - Total: 182.5 km^{2} (70.5 sq mi)

Population
  - Total(s): 394 (SAL 2021)
- Postcode: 6450
Localities around Monjingup
Dalyup	Gibson	Gibson
Dalyup	Monjingup	Myrup
Dalyup	Pink Lake	Chadwick

Monjingup is a locality of the Shire of Esperance in the Goldfields-Esperance region of Western Australia. The South Coast Highway and the Kalgoorlie to Esperance railway pass through Monjingup while the Coolgardie–Esperance Highway forms its eastern border. The western part of the townsite of Shark Lake is located in the north-east of Monjingup, while the Lake Warden Nature Reserve is located in the south-east.

Monjingup is on the traditional land of the Njunga people of the Noongar nation. The Njunga were previously part of the Wudjari Noongar, but separated from them for cultural reasons.

The Lake Warden Nature Reserve was gazetted on 23 July 2010, has a size of 7.03 square kilometres (2.71 sq mi) and is located in the Esperance Plains bioregion. A second nature reserve, the Unnamed WA24953 Nature Reserve, is also located within Monjingup. It was gazetted on 28 March 1958, has a size of 0.43 square kilometres (0.17 sq mi), and is also located in the Esperance Plains bioregion.
