= List of acts of the Parliament of Western Australia from 1924 =

This is a list of acts of the Parliament of Western Australia for the year 1924.

== 1924 ==
Short title, or popular name	Citation	Royal assent
Long title
	No. 1 of 1924	12 August 1924
An Act to apply out of the Consolidated Revenue Fund the sum of Eight Hundred and Five Thousand Pounds, and from Moneys to Credit of the General Loan Fund Seven Hundred and Forty-five Thousand Pounds, and from Moneys to Credit of the Government Property Sales Fund Ten Thousand Five Hundred Pounds, and from Moneys to Credit of the Land Improvement Loan Fund Three Thousand Pounds to the Service of the Year ending 30th June, 1925, and to apply out of the Public Account the sum of Three Hundred Thousand Pounds for the purposes of temporary Advances to be made by the Colonial Treasurer.
Unclaimed Moneys Act Amendment Act 1924	No. 2 of 1924	3 October 1924
An Act to amend the Unclaimed Moneys Act, 1912. (Note: Unclaimed Moneys Act 1912 (No. 34))
Fremantle Municipal Tramways Act 1924	No. 9 of 1924	25 November 1924
An Act to enable the Fremantle Municipal Tramways and Electric Lighting Board to provide and work Omnibus Services in connection with the Tramways controlled by the Board.
Waroona–Lake Clifton Railway Act 1924	No. 24 of 1924	31 December 1924
An Act to authorise the Discontinuance of the Waroona–Lake Clifton Railway.
Norseman–Salmon Gums Railway Act 1924	No. 27 of 1924	31 December 1924
An Act to authorise the Construction of a Railway from Norseman to Salmon Gums.
	No. X of 1924	
Workers' Compensation Act Amendment Act 1924	No. 40 of 1924	16 January 1925
An Act to amend the Workers' Compensation Act, 1912. (Note: Workers' Compensation Act 1912 (No. 69))

== Sources ==
- "legislation.wa.gov.au".
