= Acacia sorophylla =

Scientific classification
- Kingdom: Plantae
- Clade: Tracheophytes
- Clade: Angiosperms
- Clade: Eudicots
- Clade: Rosids
- Order: Fabales
- Family: Fabaceae
- Subfamily: Caesalpinioideae
- Clade: Mimosoid clade
- Genus: Acacia
- Species: A. sorophylla

Binomial name
- Acacia sorophylla E.Pritz.
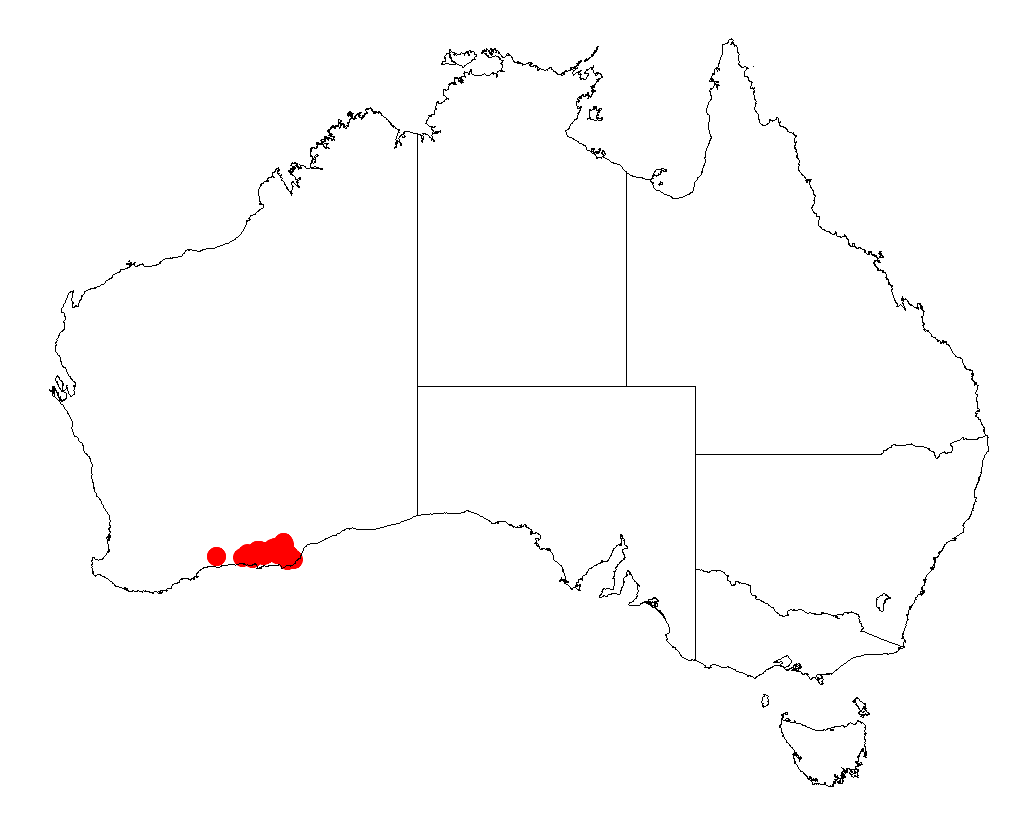
- Occurrence data from AVH

Species of legume

Acacia sorophylla is a shrub of the genus Acacia and the subgenus Phyllodineae that is endemic to a small area of south western Australia

== Description ==
The dense intricate shrub typically grows to a height of 0.1 to 0.4 metres (0.3 to 1.3 ft). It has glabrous terminal branches that often arch downwards. Like most species of Acacia it has phyllodes rather than true leaves. They form in bundles or cluster and are crowded on to short knotty branchlets. The thick and nerveless phyllodes have an obtriangular or oblanceolate or wedge-like shape with a length of 1.5 to 3 mm (0.059 to 0.118 in) and a width of 0.5 to 1 mm (0.020 to 0.039 in). It blooms from October to December and produces yellow flowers.

== Distribution ==
It is native to a small area along the south coast in the Goldfields-Esperance region of Western Australia just inland from Esperance where it is commonly situated on hilltops, limestone rises, plains and along the edges of salt lakes growing in sandy or clay or calcareous loamy soils. The bulk of the population is found between Scaddan in the west to around Mount Ragged in the Cape Arid National Park to the east usually as a part of shrub mallee or low Eucalyptus woodland communities.

== See also ==
- List of Acacia species
