= West Beach, Western Australia =

Locality in the Shire of Esperance, Western Australia

West Beach
- Suburb
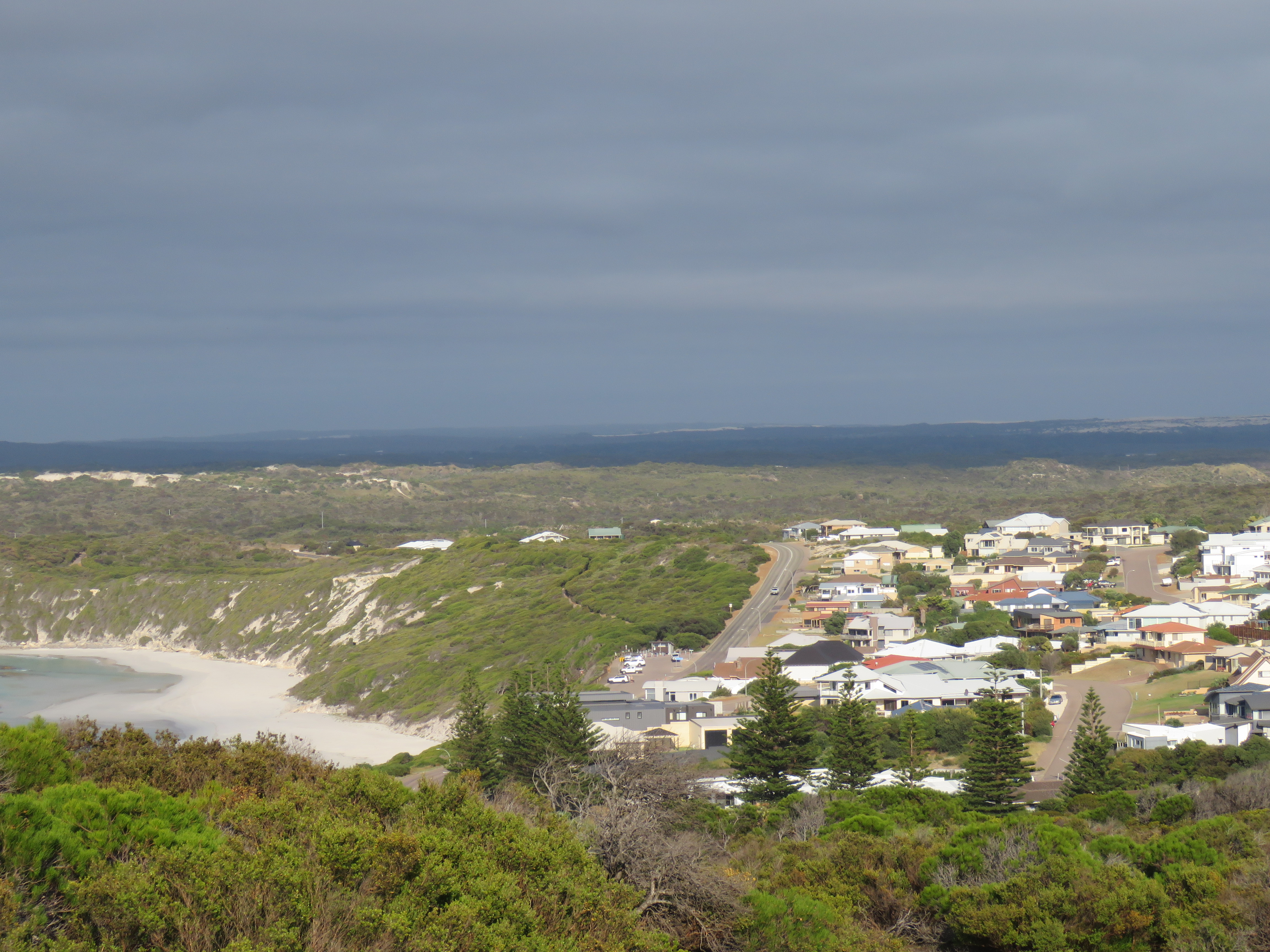
- West Beach seen from the east, near Dempster Head

- Coordinates: 33°52′26″S 121°52′41″E
- Country: Australia
- State: Western Australia
- City: Esperance
- LGA(s): Shire of Esperance
- Location: 4 km (2.5 mi) SW of Esperance

Government
  - State electorate(s): Roe
  - Federal division(s): O'Connor

Area
  - Total: 21.1 km^{2} (8.1 sq mi)

Population
  - Total(s): 1,483 (SAL 2021)
- Postcode: 6450
Suburbs around West Beach
Pink Lake	Sinclair	Esperance
Dalyup	West Beach	Southern Ocean
Southern Ocean	Southern Ocean	Southern Ocean

West Beach is a suburb of Esperance, a town in south-eastern Western Australia. It is located south of Esperance's central business district, extending southwesterly for several kilometres along the southern coast. Its local government area is the Shire of Esperance.

The suburb was gazetted in 1971.

== Demographics ==
In the 2006 census, West Beach had a population of 1,507. West Beach residents had a median age of 39, which was higher than the regional average, and the median individual income was $591 per week compared with $454 per week in the Esperance region. 2.3% of residents identified as Indigenous Australians.
