= Leucopogon rugulosus =

Conservation status
- Priority One — Poorly Known Taxa (DEC)

Scientific classification
- Kingdom: Plantae
- Clade: Tracheophytes
- Clade: Angiosperms
- Clade: Eudicots
- Clade: Asterids
- Order: Ericales
- Family: Ericaceae
- Genus: Leucopogon
- Species: L. rugulosus

Binomial name
- Leucopogon rugulosus Hislop
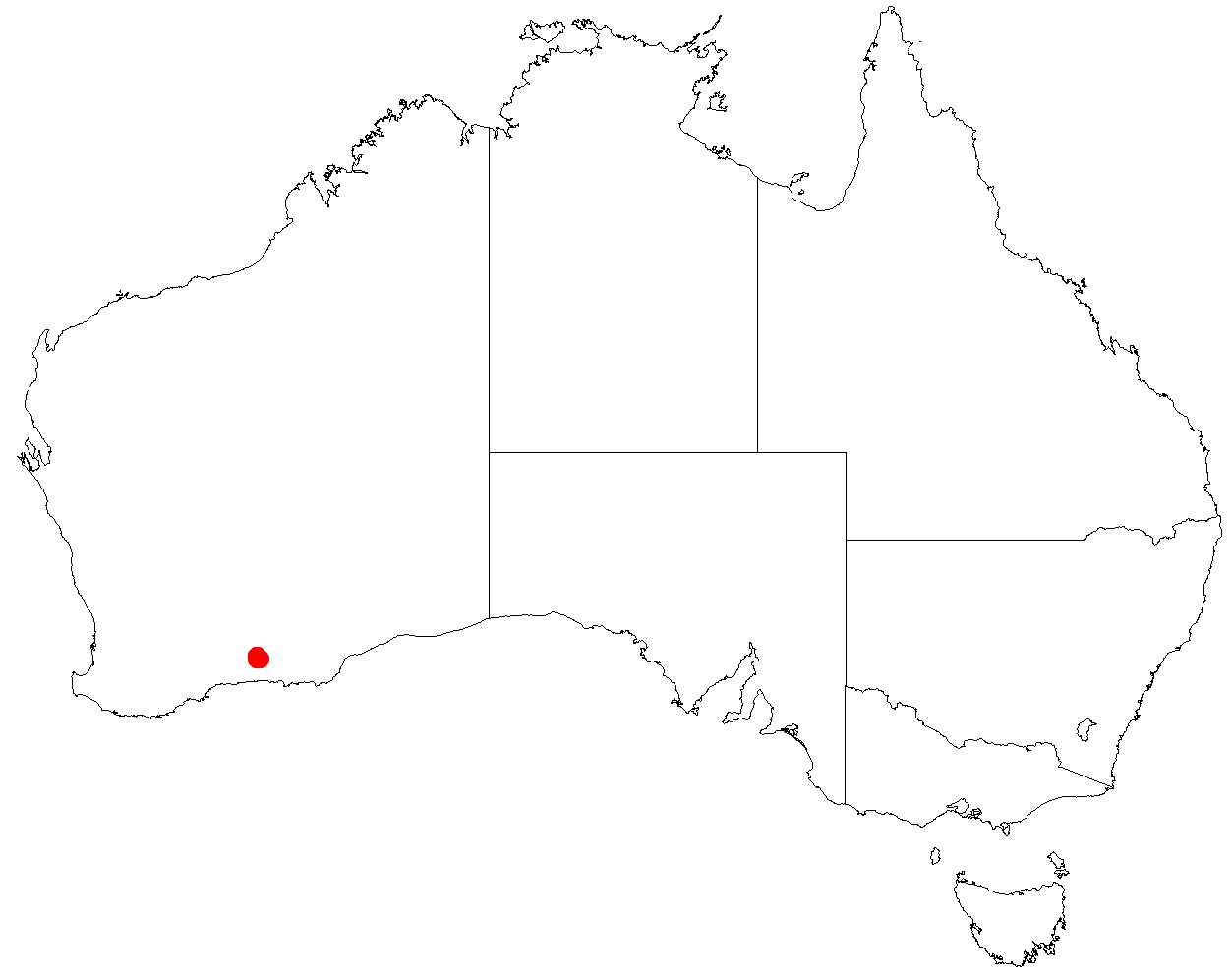
- Occurrence data from AVH

Species of plant

Leucopogon rugulosus is a species of flowering plant in the heath family Ericaceae and is endemic to a restricted part of the south-west of Western Australia. It is an erect shrub with a single stem at ground level, elliptic or egg-shaped leaves with the narrower end towards the base, and erect clusters of three to nine white, tube-shaped flowers.

== Description ==
Leucopogon rugulosus is an erect shrub that typically grows up to 100 cm (39 in) high and wide, and has a single stem at ground level. The leaves are spirally arranged, usually pointed slightly upwards, elliptic to egg-shaped with the narrower end towards the base, 1.7–3.1 mm (0.067–0.122 in) long and 1.1–1.7 mm (0.043–0.067 in) wide on petiole 0.3–0.5 mm (0.012–0.020 in) long. The upper surface of the leaves is wrinkled and shiny, the lower surface densely hairy, and the edges of the leaves are rolled under. The flowers are arranged in groups of three to nine on the ends of branches and in upper leaf axils, with egg-shaped bracts 0.9–1.3 mm (0.035–0.051 in) long and egg-shaped bracteoles 1.1–1.7 mm (0.043–0.067 in) long. The sepals are egg-shaped, 1.9–2.3 mm (0.075–0.091 in) long, the petals white and joined at the base to form a bell-shaped tube 1.3–1.9 mm (0.051–0.075 in) long, the lobes 1.7–2.5 mm (0.067–0.098 in) long and densely bearded on the inner surface. Flowering occurs from May to September and the fruit is a more or less spherical drupe 1.5–1.6 mm (0.059–0.063 in) long.

== Taxonomy and naming ==
Leucopogon rugulosus was first formally described in 2016 by Michael Clyde Hislop in the journal Nuytsia from specimens collected north-west of Esperance in 2002. The specific epithet (rugulosus) means "wrinkled" or "creased", referring to the upper leaf surface.

== Distribution and habitat ==
This leucopogon grows in heath and open mallee woodland in a restricted to an area near Cascade in the Mallee bioregion of south-western Western Australia.

== Conservation status ==
Leucopogon rugulosus is listed as "Priority One" by the Government of Western Australia Department of Biodiversity, Conservation and Attractions, meaning that it is known from only one or a few locations that are potentially at risk.
