= Styphelia sulcata =

Conservation status
- Priority One — Poorly Known Taxa (DEC)

Scientific classification
- Kingdom: Plantae
- Clade: Tracheophytes
- Clade: Angiosperms
- Clade: Eudicots
- Clade: Asterids
- Order: Ericales
- Family: Ericaceae
- Genus: Styphelia
- Species: S. sulcata

Binomial name
- Styphelia sulcata Hislop & Puente-Lel.

Species of plant

Styphelia sulcata is a species of flowering plant in the heath family Ericaceae and is endemic to a small area in the south of Western Australia. It is a low, compact shrub with narrowly egg-shaped leaves and white flowers arranged singly in leaf axils.

== Description ==
Styphelia sulcata is a low, compact shrub that typically grows up to about 40 cm (16 in) high and wide. The leaves are narrowly egg-shaped and pressed against the stem, 4.0–8.2 mm (0.16–0.32 in) long and 0.8–1.6 mm (0.031–0.063 in) wide on a petiole 0.3–0.6 mm (0.012–0.024 in) long, and with a fine, but brittle point on the tip. Both surfaces of the leaves are more or less glabrous, the lower surface strongly grooved. The flowers are sessile and mostly arranged singly in leaf axils, with bracts 2.0–2.5 mm (0.079–0.098 in) long and bracteoles 2.8–3.5 mm (0.11–0.14 in) long at the base. The sepals are narrowly egg-shaped, 4.8–5.5 mm (0.19–0.22 in) long and hairy. The petals are white and joined at the base to form a more or less cylindrical tube 3.2–4.2 mm (0.13–0.17 in) long and 0.9–1.1 mm (0.035–0.043 in) wide, the lobes 3.2–4.5 mm (0.13–0.18 in) long and densely hairy on the inner surface. Flowering has been observed between May and June and the fruit is a more or less cylindrical drupe 3.2–4 mm (0.13–0.16 in) long and 1.2–1.6 mm (0.047–0.063 in) wide.

== Taxonomy and naming ==
Styphelia sulcata was first formally described in 2019 by Michael Hislop and Caroline Puente-Lelievre from specimens collected near Cascade in 2002. The specific epithet (sulcata) means "furrowed", referring to the lower surface of the leaves.

== Distribution and habitat ==
This species grows in sandy soils in mallee woodland near Cascade and Condingup in the Mallee bioregion in the south of Western Australia.

== Conservation status ==
Styphelia sulcata is listed as "Priority One" by the Government of Western Australia Department of Biodiversity, Conservation and Attractions, meaning that it is known from only one or a few locations where it is potentially at risk.
