= Pink Lake, Western Australia =

Locality in the Shire of Esperance, Western Australia

Pink Lake
- Suburb
- Coordinates: 33°50′31″S 121°49′23″E
- Country: Australia
- State: Western Australia
- City: Esperance
- LGA(s): Shire of Esperance
- Location: 5 km (3.1 mi) WNW of Esperance

Government
  - State electorate(s): Roe
  - Federal division(s): O'Connor

Area
  - Total: 44 km^{2} (17 sq mi)

Population
  - Total(s): 1,042 (SAL 2021)
- Postcode: 6450
Suburbs around Pink Lake
Monjingup	Monjingup	Chadwick
Dalyup	Pink Lake	Nulsen
Dalyup	West Beach	Sinclair

Pink Lake is an outer western suburb of Esperance, a town in south-eastern Western Australia. Its local government area is the Shire of Esperance, and it is located 5 kilometres (3 mi) west-northwest of Esperance's central business district.

It is named for Pink Lake, a pink-blue lake located within its boundaries.
