= Coolgardie–Esperance Highway =

Highway in Western Australia

Coolgardie–Esperance Highway Western Australia
- Map of south-west Western Australia with Coolgardie–Esperance Highway highlighted in red

General information
- Type: Highway
- Length: 370.82 km (230 mi)
- Gazetted: 16 August 1957
- Route number(s): National Highway 94 (Coolgardie–Norseman); National Route 1 (Norseman–Esperance)

Major junctions
- North end: Great Eastern Highway (National Highway 94 / Alternate National Route 94), Coolgardie
- Goldfields Highway (Alternate National Route 94); Eyre Highway (National Highway 1); South Coast Highway (National Route 1)
- South end: Esperance Port

Location(s)
- Major settlements: Widgiemooltha, Norseman, Salmon Gums, Grass Patch, Gibson

Highway system
- Highways in Australia; National Highway • Freeways in Australia; Highways in Western Australia

Coolgardie–Esperance Highway is a 370-kilometre (230 mi) Western Australian highway between Coolgardie and Esperance. It runs in a north–south direction linking the state's Eastern Goldfields to the coast.

The Coolgardie–Norseman stretch (National Highway 94) forms part of the Perth to Adelaide National Highway route and has a higher proportion of heavy traffic. This section passes through an undulating countryside, mainly dotted with patches of trees, scrub and salt lakes. The interstate traffic continues eastwards via Eyre Highway from its junction in Norseman. The Norseman–Esperance portion (National Route 1) is a part of Australia's Highway 1. The scenery changes to agricultural land, and on approach to Esperance it passes near lakes and hillsides.

Following the Western Australian gold rushes of the 1890s, a track developed between Coolgardie and Esperance, the closest harbour to the goldfields. A road was constructed along this track in the late 1920s and 1930s. From the late 1930s attention turned to sealing the road, but it took until 1960 before a single-lane seal was constructed between Coolgardie and Esperance. The road was gazetted as Coolgardie–Esperance Highway three years earlier, on 16 August 1957. Further work occurred between 1974 and 1980, providing a two-lane sealed road for the length of the highway.

== Route description ==
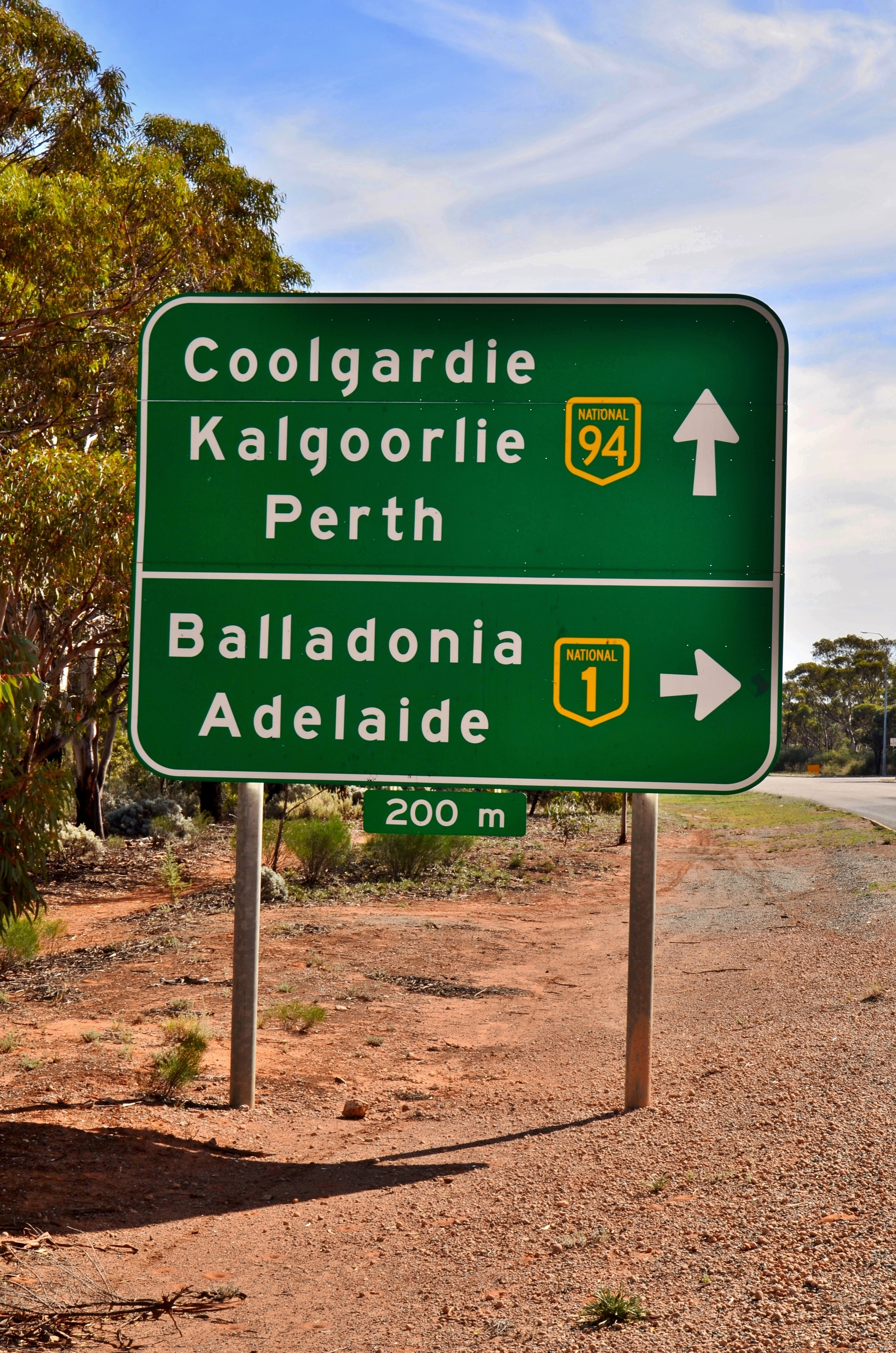
Highway sign at Norseman

Coolgardie–Esperance Highway commences at Great Eastern Highway at Coolgardie. It heads south as National Highway 94 to Norseman, the starting point of the interstate route Eyre Highway. Coolgardie–Esperance Highway continues south as National Route 1 to the coastal town of Esperance, at a roundabout with Harbour Road, Fisheries Road, and Norseman Road. Harbour Road is the southernmost section of the highway, a controlled-access bypass of the town linking to South Coast Highway and the Esperance Port.

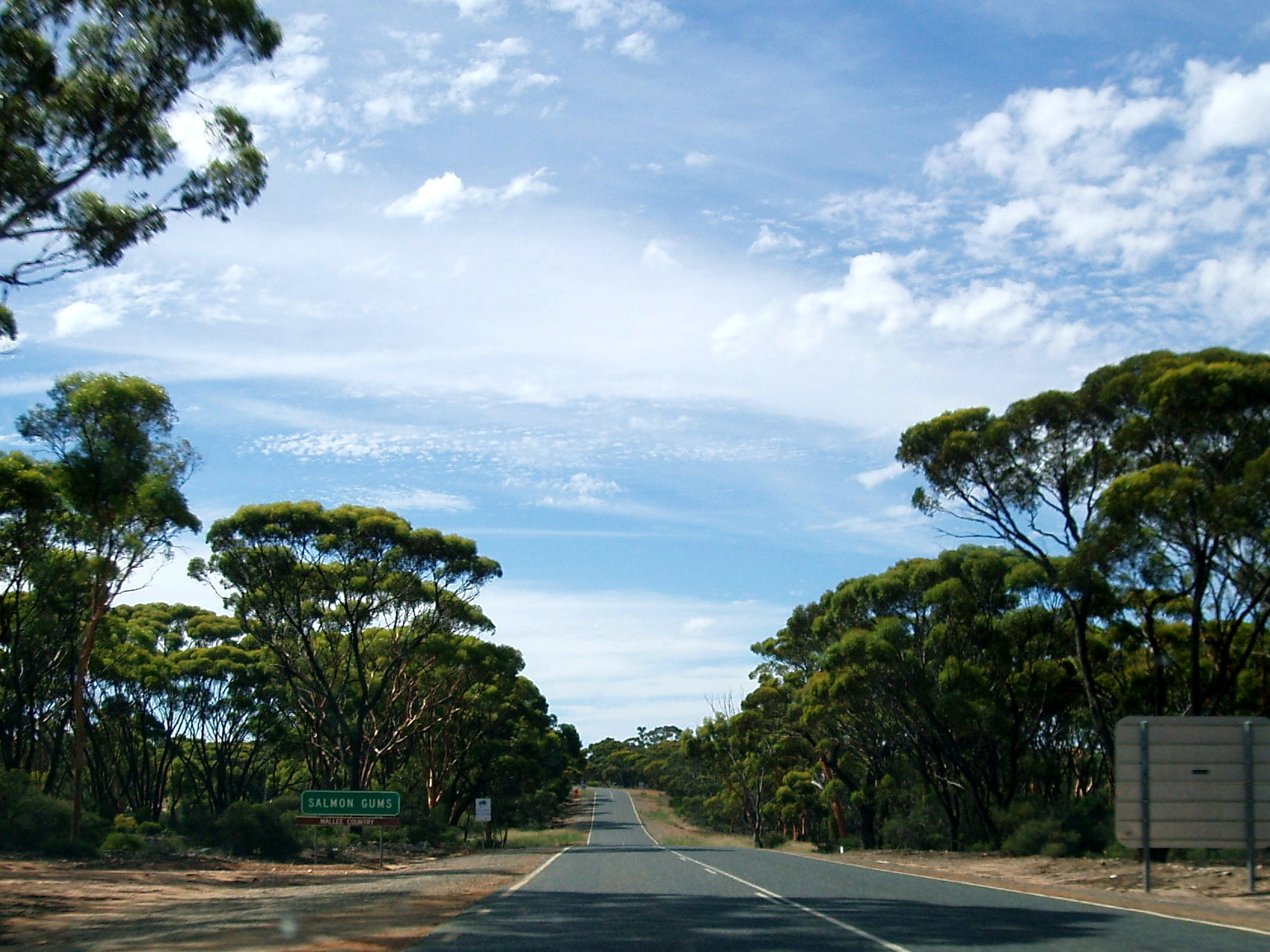
Coolgardie–Esperance Highway approaching Salmon Gums

Coolgardie–Esperance Highway is generally a two-lane single carriageway road, with a speed limit of 110 kilometres per hour (70 mph), except in and around built up areas. Between Coolgardie and Norseman the highway proceeds through "undulating, timbered, and salt lake country", while south of Norseman it travels across agricultural land, and on approach to Esperance it passes near lakes and hillsides. There are few towns on the highway: Coolgardie, Widgiemooltha, Norseman, Salmon Gums, Grass Patch, Gibson, and Esperance. These are mostly separated by distances of 50 to 100 kilometres (30 to 60 mi), except for Salmon Gums–Grass Patch and Gibson–Esperance which are only 29 kilometres (18 mi) and 22 kilometres (14 mi) apart respectively.

Main Roads Western Australia monitors traffic volume across the state's road network, including various locations along Coolgardie–Esperance Highway. In 2013/14, the traffic volume ranged between 350 and 4000 vehicles per day, with the highest volume recorded south of South Coast Highway. The highest percentage of heavy traffic was 51.6% north of Goldfields Highway.

The reported safety of Coolgardie–Esperance Highway has varied between assessments. Reports commissioned by the Royal Automobile Club of Western Australia (RAC) in 2006 and 2008 give the entire highway a three-star safety rating out of five. The state's overall highway network was generally rated as three-star or four-star, with around 10% in 2006 and 5% in 2008 receiving a two-star rating. The National Highway section was assessed by the Australian Automobile Association in 2011 to be among the lowest risk highways in the country, based on total number of casualty crashes (Note: The Australian Automobile Association's How Safe are our Roads? Rating Australia's National Network for Risk report defines a casualty crash as "any road crash in which at least one person is killed or injured and this includes serious injuries which typically represent one third of casualty crashes".) per length of road. However, individual risk based on casualty crash rates per vehicle kilometre travelled was assessed as medium-high. In 2013, that portion of the highway was assessed as having 7% of its length rated as one-star, 47% as two-star, and 46% as three-star out of five stars.

== History ==
=== Background ===
Following the Western Australian gold rushes of the 1890s, a track developed between Coolgardie and Esperance, the closest harbour to the gold fields. Horse-drawn carts would transport supplies and travellers along the 240-mile-long (390 km) route. Due to the sandy nature of the track, horse feed shipped into Esperance needed to be distributed to various points along the track. The Eastern Goldfields Railway from Perth to Kalgoorlie opened in 1897, and a branch railway extended down to Norseman in 1909. By this time, however, it was much cheaper to transfer goods by rail from Fremantle, and no longer profitable to cart goods along the track from Esperance to Norseman.

=== Construction ===
The newly formed Main Roads Board (Note: Predecessor to the Main Roads Department, later renamed Main Roads Western Australia) took over control and maintenance of the Coolgardie–Esperance route and twenty-one other important roads between 1926 and 1928, which were declared "main roads". To increase the usability of the overall main road network, the work schedule for these roads prioritised the worst individual segments, rather than any one road. (Note: For example, in 1928/29, twenty-two separate sections of the Perth–Albany road were improved, but the whole route was not completely sealed until 1939.) The Coolgardie to Esperance route was allocated £3,000 for new construction in the first year of these arrangements. By January 1927, construction had commenced on an eight-mile (13 km) portion north of Salmon Gums, which had been colloquially known as "The Glue Pot".

Construction works continued in the following years, including around Widgiemooltha in 1929, Scaddan in 1930, and at Higginsville in 1931. From October 1931, work on the northern end and southern end of the road was included as part of the government sustenance work scheme, funded by a federal grant. In 1932 the Red Lake–Grass Patch–Treslove section was worked on, and a portion at Salmon Gums was improved in 1933, with the continuation of the relief work scheme resulting in £5000 being allocated to the road. By August 1933, the whole route was reported to be in reasonable condition, apart from some rough portions between Coolgardie and Widgiemooltha.

Construction of the Coolgardie–Widgiemooltha section was completed in 1934, and opened to traffic progressively between June and September of that year. The constructed length was extended to Pioneer between late-1934 and May 1935, with works then progressing to the Pioneer–Norseman portion. The works at Norseman were by August nearly complete, and by November construction was underway south of Norseman, on the Scaddan–Gibson section. Further construction was undertaken in early 1936 south of Norseman and Gibson, and near Esperance later in the year. The Red Lake to Treslove portion was under construction in 1937, with further work near Esperance, Widglemooltha, and Treslove in 1938.

=== Sealing ===
In 1938, attention from local governments in the area focused on providing a sealed road along the highway. The matter was raised at the April 1938 conference of local governing bodies, and again in September 1939. In 1945, it was noted by the Commissioner of Main Roads that it could be years before Coolgardie–Esperance Highway would be sealed. Such work was still to be completed on the Merredin–Southern Cross road, having been discontinued due to war and not yet restarted as bitumen was in short supply.

Work to provide a bitumen surface was under way by January 1948, with 8.5 miles (13.7 km) prepared for surfacing by April through "reconditioning and tar priming". In July, Minister for Works Doney stated that there was no time frame for works beyond the eight-mile (13 km) section out of Coolgardie. There were no further surfacing works planned in 1950, nor in 1952 while Great Eastern Highway was still yet to be fully sealed. In April 1953 the Dundas Road Board considered bitumenising the road an urgent matter, especially the section north from Norseman. Dr. D. N. Kirkham of the Dundas Road Board considered that section to be a "disgrace to the country", the poorest quality experience along the interstate route between Sydney and Perth.

The road was gazetted as Coolgardie–Esperance Highway on 16 August 1957, (Note: The section from Coolgardie to Norseman was originally gazetted as part of Eyre Highway on 11 June 1943) but remained unsealed until 1960, when a 3.7 metre wide (single-lane) seal was completed between Coolgardie and Esperance. In 1974 the road was upgraded further and a two-lane seal was completed between Coolgardie and Norseman. In 1980 a two-lane seal was completed between Norseman and Danielle Siding, completing the two-lane seal from Coolgardie to Esperance.

=== Esperance Port Access Corridor ===
The Esperance Port Access Corridor project upgraded Harbour Road in Esperance to improve freight access. It involved realignment of the road and railway leading to the port to provide grade separation between them, through a rail tunnel under Harbour Road and a local road connection (Twilight Beach Road to The Esplanade) via a bridge over the railway. The project was funded by the state and federal governments. Construction commenced in 2012, with the turning of the first sod on 15 March by federal transport minister Anthony Albanese and state transport minister Troy Buswell. The project was completed in June 2014.

== Major intersections ==
| LGA | Location | km | mi | Destinations | Notes |
|---|---|---|---|---|---|
| Coolgardie | Coolgardie | 0.00 | 0.00 | Great Eastern Highway (National Highway 94 west / Alternate National Route 94 east) – Coolgardie, Perth, Kalgoorlie | Northern highway terminus |
| Coolgardie | Widgiemooltha | 54.36 | 33.78 | Goldfields Highway (Alternate National Route 94) – Kambalda, Kalgoorlie | |
| Dundas | Norseman | 164.28 | 102.08 | Eyre Highway (National Highway 1) – Balladonia, Adelaide | Route transition: southern terminus of National Highway 94, northern terminus of National Route 1 |
| Esperance | Chadwick–Castletown boundary | 365.04 | 226.83 | Fisheries Road east / Norseman Road south – Albany, Condingup, Esperance town centre | Roundabout; Southern extent named as "Coolgardie–Esperance Highway", continues west named as "Harbour Road" (National Route 1) |
| Esperance | Chadwick | 366.38 | 227.66 | South Coast Highway (National Route 1) – Ravensthorpe, Albany | Route transition: southern extent as National Route 1, no route number further south |
| Esperance | Nulsen | 368.85 | 229.19 | Pink Lake Road west – Pink Lake | |
| Esperance | Esperance | 368.97 | 229.27 | Pink Lake Road east | |
| Esperance | Esperance | 370.82 | 230.42 | Smith Street to Twilight Beach Road & The Esplanade | Southern highway terminus; access to Esperance Port |
Route transition

== See also ==
- Highways in Australia
- List of highways in Western Australia
