= Municipality of Esperance (Western Australia) =

Former local government area in Western Australia

The Municipality of Esperance was a local government area in Western Australia centred on the coastal town of Esperance. It existed from 1895 until 1908.

== Establishment and early years ==
It was established on 27 September 1895. It followed earlier advocacy, including public meetings and petitions, from a local progress league to form a municipality and separate from the surrounding Dundas Roads District, although a separate Esperance Road District had been newly formed by the time the municipality was proclaimed. The first councillors were sworn in on 1 December 1895, with T. Edwards becoming the first mayor.

It secured a block next to the Esperance Post Office for municipal chambers in December 1895, with municipal buildings having been built by 1898. The municipal offices were later used as a courthouse and are now located within the Museum Park Period Village.

The municipality was praised by the Esperance Times in 1897 for having made "great strides" and having "expended judiciously" on improving roads and footpaths, with the Norseman Times sharing similar sentiments a year later. The council expressed repeated frustration with the refusal of the colonial government to build a railway to Esperance from the mines at Norseman, and widely circulated a pamphlet to that effect in 1898. It saw large drops in rateable property with the town's decline in the late 1890s.

== Infighting and turmoil ==
By 1905, the council was embroiled in numerous pieces of litigation, and was being criticised for refusing to pay judgments made against it in the Local Court. The council responded by claiming that the "aristocracy" wanted to "do away with the municipality" because it prevented them from doing as they liked. An extremely contentious municipal election in 1905 saw the returning officer assaulted and an election document destroyed by a mayoral candidate. The candidate then alleged that the town clerk and mayor had illegally attempted to prevent him from nominating. Subsequent court action found in favour of the accused mayoral candidate with costs on the civil counts and acquitted him on a criminal count. The Coolgardie Miner published an editorial in December that year condemning the council's unseemly conduct. The Norseman Times published multiple calls for the municipality's abolition in October 1906, one claiming that "three special acts have [had] to be passed in one session to condone its offences" because it had "transgress[ed] or neglect[ed] its duty". This was followed later that month by a further court defeat with costs awarded against the council.

In November 1906, the Norseman Times published an editorial arguing for the abolition of the council and residents began circulating petitions against the council, with a petition for the council's abolition published in the Government Gazette in March 1908. In June 1907, a physical brawl broke out at a council meeting between the mayor and town clerk and a dissenting councillor. A letter circulated in defence of the mayor purportedly signed by fellow councillors was publicly repudiated by a councillor who denied having signed it, and an attempt by the mayor to having the dissenting councillor prosecuted was dismissed in court. In November 1907, the mayor and supporters were accused of trying to keep their opponents off the municipal roll in defiance of the Municipal Act.

== Amalgamation and demise ==
A public meeting was held in February 1908 on a potential amalgamation with the Esperance Road District, with supporters citing the figure that 86% of the council's budget was being spent on administration. The Mayor and supporters strongly opposed amalgamation, while a compromise suggestion was that the council, given that they were "very unpopular with a considerable section of the ratepayers", should resign. It was reported that the motion in favour of amalgamation had been supported by a majority, but that the Mayor had declared it to have failed, refused a division, and then closed the meeting.

A state government inquiry into the petitions and counter-petitions regarding amalgamation found that a majority of petition-signers had supported amalgamation, even while many allegedly disenfranchised supporters were not counted due to not being listed on the municipal rolls. In October 1908, auditors examining the last half year's municipal accounts described the "balance-sheet as fraudulent, and the entries in the cash-book as fictitious, while the books are in a state of confusion", which a week later resulted in the town clerk being committed for trial for embezzlement.

The municipality was officially dissolved and merged into the surrounding Esperance Road District on 30 October 1908. The Norseman Times wrote that the amalgamation had "given general satisfaction to the residents of Esperance, and will no doubt be the means of restoring its prosperity".
