= Shark Lake =

Lake in Western Australia

- Location in Western Australia
- Interactive map of Shark Lake
- Location: Goldfields-Esperance, Western Australia
- Coordinates: 33°45′59″S 121°51′34″E
- Type: Freshwater
- Primary inflows: Groundwater and surface runoff
- Basin countries: Australia

Shark Lake is a freshwater lake in the Goldfields-Esperance region of Western Australia approximately 13 kilometres (8 mi) north of Esperance.

It lies north of the townsite of Shark Lake, which was gazetted in 1967 and named after the lake.

The lake is situated within the Shark Lake Nature Reserve, which occupies an area of 16.1 hectares (40 acres) and is one of the few permanent freshwater lakes and wetlands on the south coast.

The lakes are predominantly fed by natural drainage from the agricultural areas to the north. Increased runoff and rising water tables from agricultural clearing have a large impact on the water quality of the lake.

Shark Lake Nature Reserve was gazetted as an A class reserve on 21 January 1972 for the purpose of conservation of flora and fauna.

Shark Lake lies in a land system that is part of the broader Esperance sand-plain. The sand-plain is gently undulating with low rises and hills. The soils are mostly deep comprising sandy grey sands over yellow clay with grey-white loamy sand around the lake. It has an average salinity of 1.7 ‰ total dissolved solids.

The lake is an important drought refuge for the area's fauna, with comparatively large numbers of birds being recorded there in summer. A total of 40 species are known to visit the lake through the year. Species of birds found at the lake include: avocet, greenshank, hooded dotterel, black swan, reed warbler, brown bittern, hoary-headed grebe, little grassbird, Australian white ibis and buff-banded rail.

The low-lying swamp areas around the lake are dominated by Melaleuca trees and scrub. Other dominant species include Calothamnus quadrifidus and Acacia cyclops. Fringing vegetation of mixed low heaths occur on lake edges with dense sedge beds of Baumea articulata, Isolepis nodosa, Juncus species and Schoenus brevifolius.

== See also ==
- List of lakes of Australia § Western Australia
