= Gibson, Western Australia =

Town and locality in the Shire of Esperance, Western Australia

Gibson
- Town
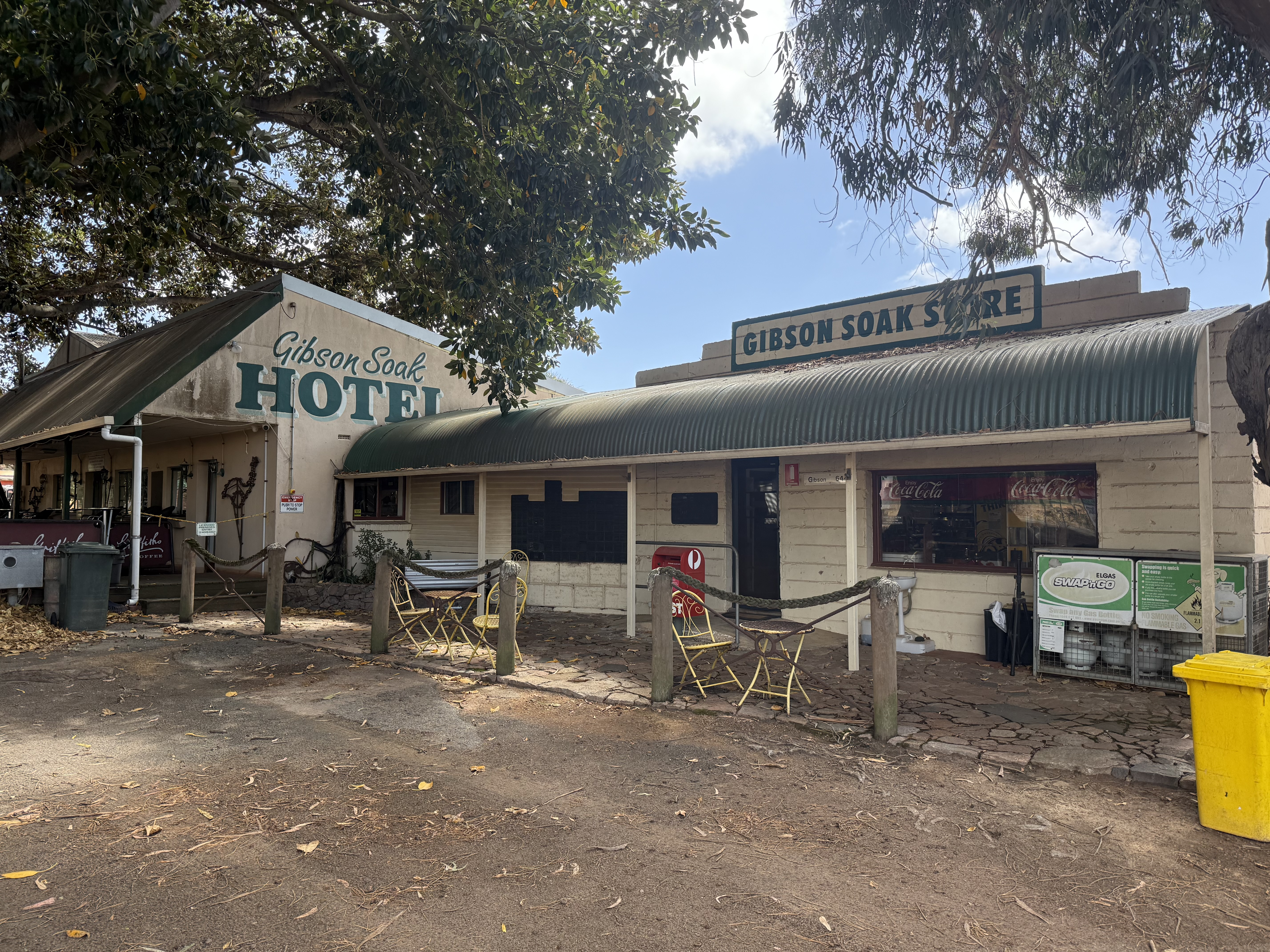
- Gibson Soak Hotel, January 2025

- Coordinates: 33°38′56″S 121°48′50″E
- Country: Australia
- State: Western Australia
- LGA(s): Shire of Esperance
- Location: 719 km (447 mi) ESE of Perth; 26 km (16 mi) N of Esperance; 180 km (110 mi) S of Norseman
- Established: 1921

Government
  - State electorate(s): Roe
  - Federal division(s): O'Connor

Area
  - Total: 735.3 km^{2} (283.9 sq mi)
- Elevation: 218 m (715 ft)

Population
  - Total(s): 406 (SAL 2021)
- Postcode: 6448
Localities around Gibson
Scaddan	Scaddan	Neridup
Dalyup	Gibson	Neridup
Dalyup	Monjingup	Myrup

Gibson is a town and locality of the Shire of Esperance in the Goldfields-Esperance region of Western Australia, about 22 kilometres (14 mi) north of Esperance. The Coolgardie–Esperance Highway and Kalgoorlie to Esperance railway the run through the locality from north to south. Esperance Airport and Helms Arboretum Reserve are located in the south-west of Gibson.

At the 2016 census, Gibson had a population of 449.

== History ==
The population of the area was 16 (7 males and 9 females) in 1898.

Gibson was originally proposed in about 1910 as a siding on the Esperance branch railway due to a reliable water source in the area, named by surveyor A. W. Canning after a man who discovered the soak whilst searching for stock. The railway itself was not completed until 1925, but the townsite was gazetted on 19 October 1921.

== Transport ==
It is served by a station on the Brookfield Rail network, and is also the site of the Esperance Airport. In 2009, a 1,800 metres (5,900 ft) long crossing called by this name but located slightly away from the town was built.

== Parks and reserves ==
Esperance Bird & Animal Park is a small animal park located at Gibson and includes: cockatoos, parrots, macaws, eagles, emus, sheep, goats, highland cattle, horses, llamas, kangaroos, wallabies and foxes.

Helms Arboretum Reserve, a biodiversity hotspot and popular wedding venue, was severely damaged by fire in December 2024. The arboretum, home to more than 120 species of planted trees, has a size of 8 square kilometres (3.1 sq mi).
