= Sinclair, Western Australia =

Locality in the Shire of Esperance, Western Australia

Sinclair
- Suburb
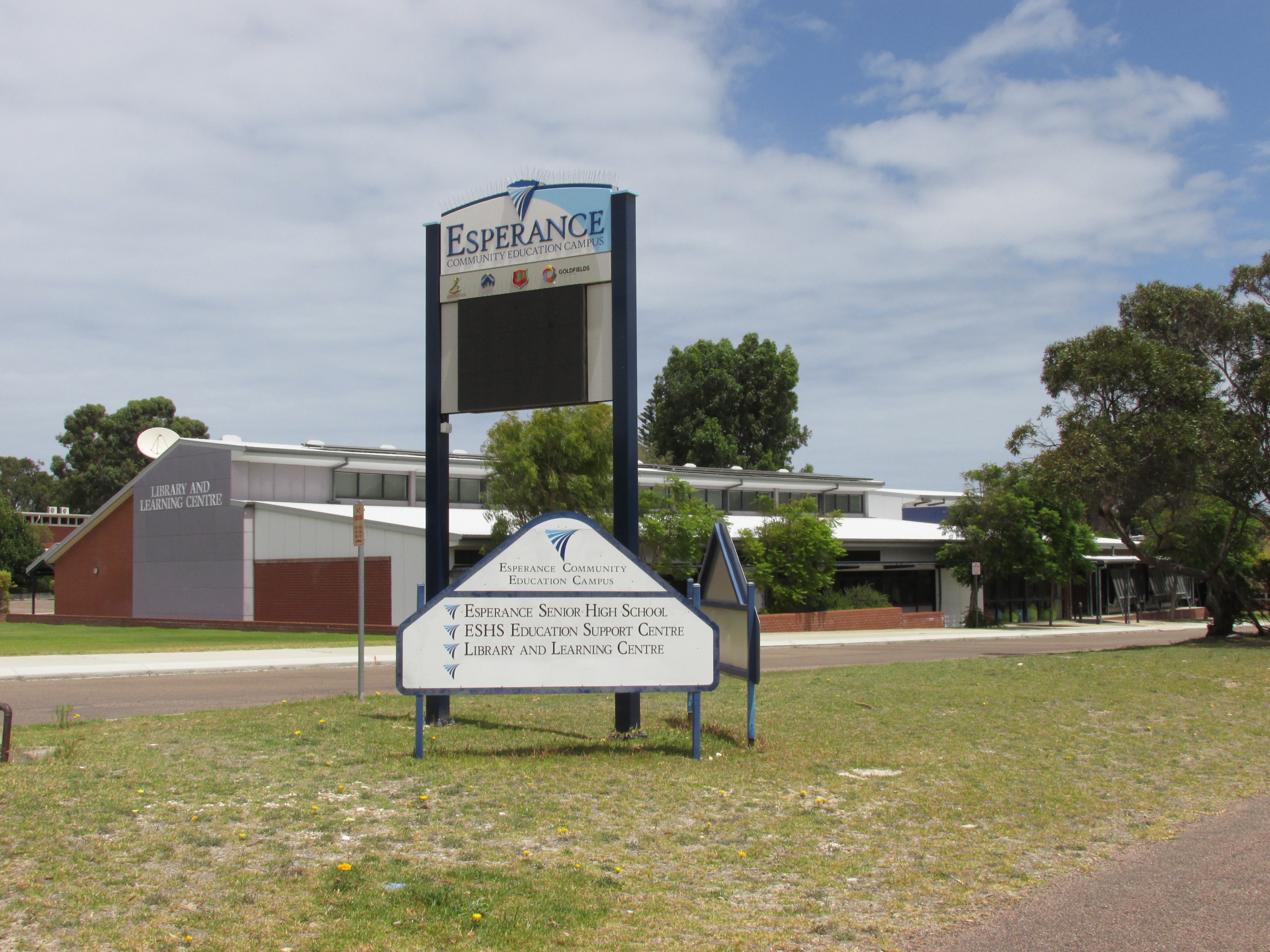
- The library and part of the campus of Esperance Senior High School

- Coordinates: 33.86310°S 121.87491°E
- Country: Australia
- State: Western Australia
- LGA(s): Shire of Esperance
- Location: 600 km (370 mi) SE of Perth; 185 km (115 mi) S of Norseman; 2 km (1.2 mi) W of Esperance

Government
  - State electorate(s): Roe
  - Federal division(s): O'Connor

Area
  - Total: 1.5 km^{2} (0.58 sq mi)

Population
  - Total(s): 765 (SAL 2021)
- Postcode: 6450
Suburbs around Sinclair
Nulsen	Nulsen	Esperance
Pink Lake	Sinclair	Esperance
West Beach	West Beach	West Beach

Sinclair is a suburb of Esperance and a locality of the Shire of Esperance in the Goldfields-Esperance region of Western Australia. Esperance Senior High School is located in Sinclair.

Sinclair is on the traditional land of the Njunga people of the Noongar nation. The Njunga were previously part of the Wudjari Noongar, but separated from them for cultural reasons.
