= Coomalbidgup, Western Australia =

Town and locality in the Shire of Esperance, Western Australia

Coomalbidgup
- Town
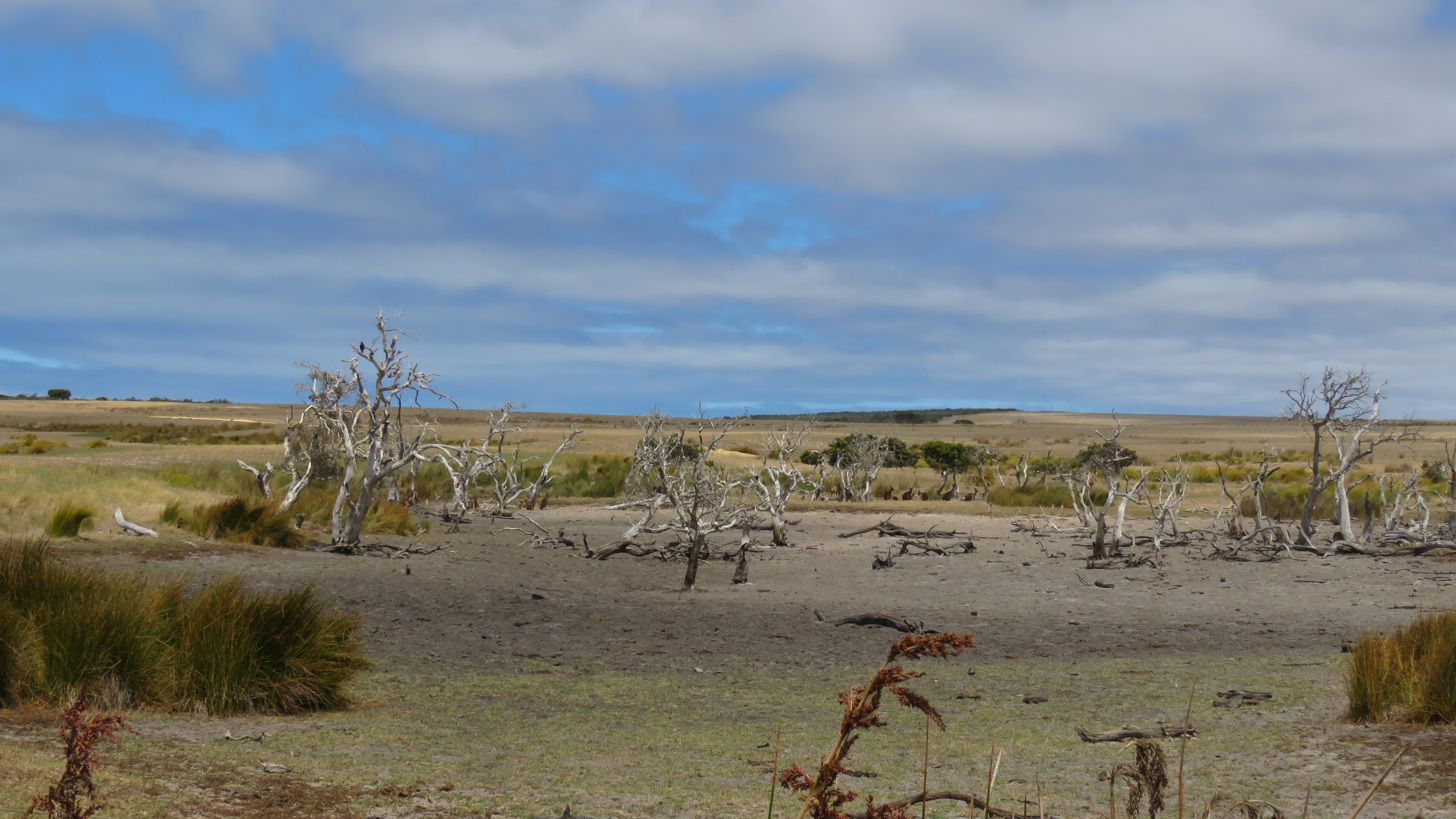
- Farmland in Coomalbidgup at the boundary of Stokes National Park

- Interactive map of Coomalbidgup
- Coordinates: 33°44′17″S 121°17′53″E
- Country: Australia
- State: Western Australia
- LGA: Shire of Esperance
- Established: 1961

Government
  - State electorate: Roe
  - Federal division: O'Connor

Area
  - Total: 1,137.7 km^{2} (439.3 sq mi)

Population
  - Total: 136 (SAL 2021)
- Postcode: 6450
Localities around Coomalbidgup
Cascade	Lort River	Dalyup
East Munglinup	Coomalbidgup	Dalyup
	Southern Ocean

Coomalbidgup is a town and locality of the Shire of Esperance in the Goldfields-Esperance region of Western Australia. It is located on the South Coast Highway and the Southern Ocean. Almost the entire coast of the locality is covered by protected area, with the Stokes Inlet and the Stokes National Park in the west and two unnamed nature reserves in the east.

At the 2021 census, Coomalbidgup had a population of 136.

Coomalbidgup is on the traditional land of the Wudjari people of the Noongar nation.

The town of Coomalbidgup was gazetted in 1961, named after the nearby Coomalbidgup Creek. The name of the creek is of Aboriginal origin, with multiple meanings of the name recorded.

The Unnamed WA27888 Nature Reserve was gazetted on 3 December 1965 and has a size of 46.15 square kilometres (17.82 mi^{2}). The Unnamed WA26885 Nature Reserve was gazetted on 19 July 1963 and has a size of 52 square kilometres (20 mi^{2}). Both are located in the Esperance Plains bioregion.

The State Heritage listed Moir Homestead Ruins are located in Coomalbidgup. The ruins are located within Stokes National Park, on the eastern shore of the inlet.
