= Nulsen, Western Australia =

Nulsen
- Suburb
- Coordinates: 33°51′50″S 121°52′34″E
- Country: Australia
- State: Western Australia
- City: Esperance
- LGA(s): Shire of Esperance
- Location: 2 km (1.2 mi) NW of Esperance

Government
  - State electorate(s): Roe
  - Federal division(s): O'Connor

Area
  - Total: 2.4 km^{2} (0.93 sq mi)

Population
  - Total(s): 1,083 (SAL 2021)
- Postcode: 6450
Suburbs around Nulsen
Chadwick	Chadwick	Chadwick
Pink Lake	Nulsen	Esperance
Pink Lake	Sinclair	Esperance

Nulsen is a western suburb of Esperance, a town in south-eastern Western Australia. Its local government area is the Shire of Esperance.

The suburb was gazetted in 1971, initially including the entire neighbouring suburb of Sinclair, which was separated in 1985. Originally designed as a State Housing Commission (now Homeswest) project, Nulsen was named for state Labor MP Emil Nulsen, who sat in the Legislative Assembly from 1932 until 1962, and represented the Esperance area from 1950 onwards. At the 2021 census, Nulsen's population was recorded to be 1,083.

== Geography ==
Nulsen is located 2 kilometres (1 mi) northwest of Esperance's central business district. It is bounded on the north by the railway line, on the east by Harbour Road and on the south by Pink Lake Road.

== Demographics ==
In the 2006 census, Nulsen had a population of 1,536. Nulsen residents had a median age of 29, which was well below the regional average, and the median individual income was $328 per week compared with $454 per week in the Esperance region. 11.7% of residents identified as Indigenous Australians.
