= Esperance (suburb) =

Locality in the Shire of Esperance, Western Australia

- Suburb
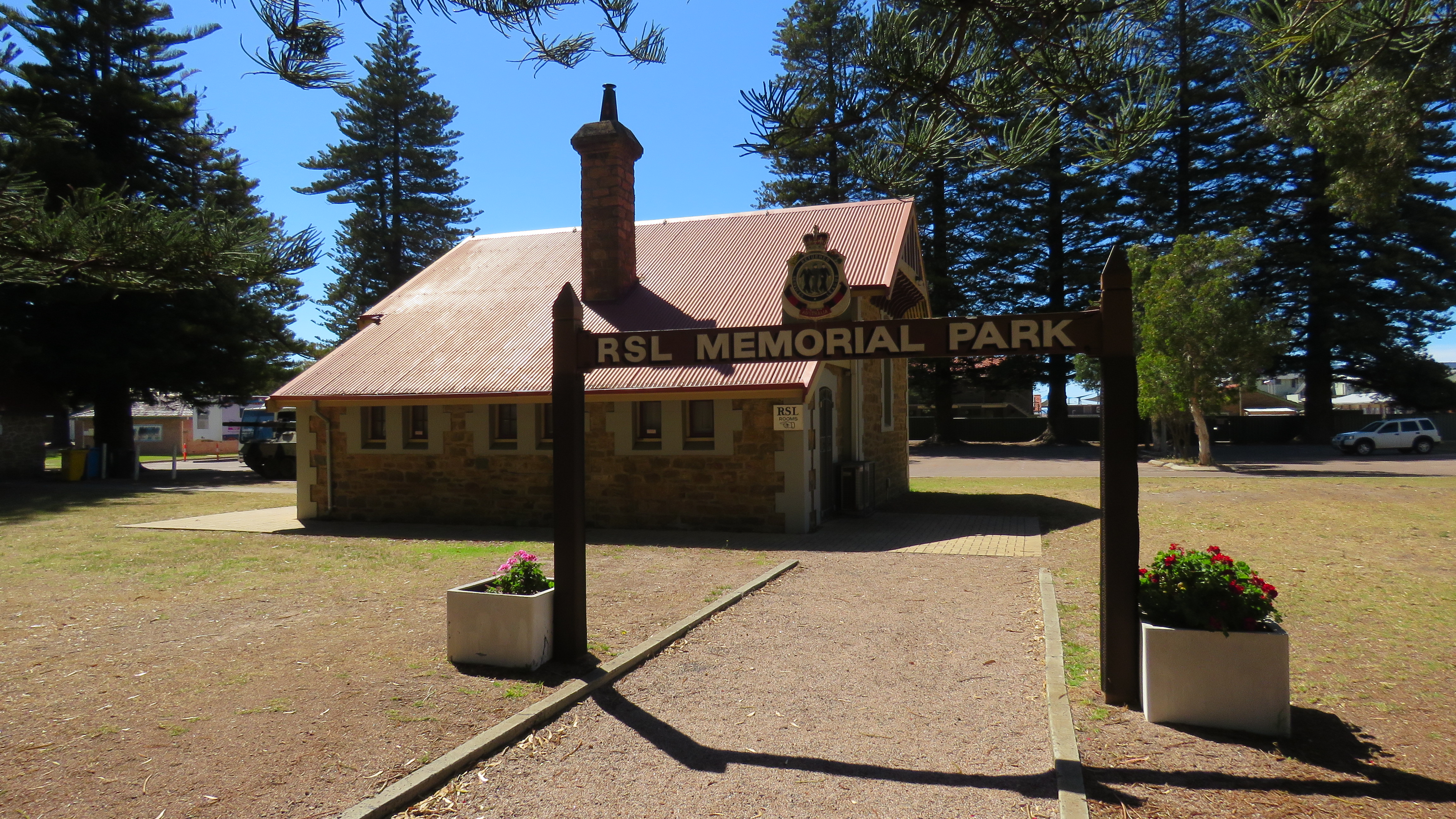
- The State heritage listed Esperance RSL rooms

- Coordinates: 33.86534°S 121.88795°E
- Country: Australia
- State: Western Australia
- LGA(s): Shire of Esperance
- Location: 602 km (374 mi) SE of Perth; 185 km (115 mi) S of Norseman; 390 km (240 mi) E of Albany

Government
  - State electorate(s): Roe
  - Federal division(s): O'Connor

Area
  - Total: 2.42 km^{2} (0.93 sq mi)

Population
  - Total(s): 2,080 (SAL 2021)
  - Density: 860/km^{2} (2,200/sq mi)
- Postcode: 6450
Suburbs around Esperance
Nulsen	Chadwick
Sinclair	Esperance	Southern Ocean
West Beach	West Beach

The suburb of Esperance is the central business district of the town of Esperance, in the Shire of Esperance, Goldfields-Esperance region of Western Australia. It is located on Esperance Bay, on the Southern Ocean.

The suburb of Esperance is on the traditional land of the Njunga people of the Noongar nation. The Njunga were previously part of the Wudjari Noongar, but separated from them for cultural reasons.

The suburb is home to a number of State heritage listed places, the Dempster Homestead, the Bijou Theatre and the RSL Building, which also includes the war memorial and the Norfolk pine trees.
