= Chadwick, Western Australia =

Chadwick
- Suburb
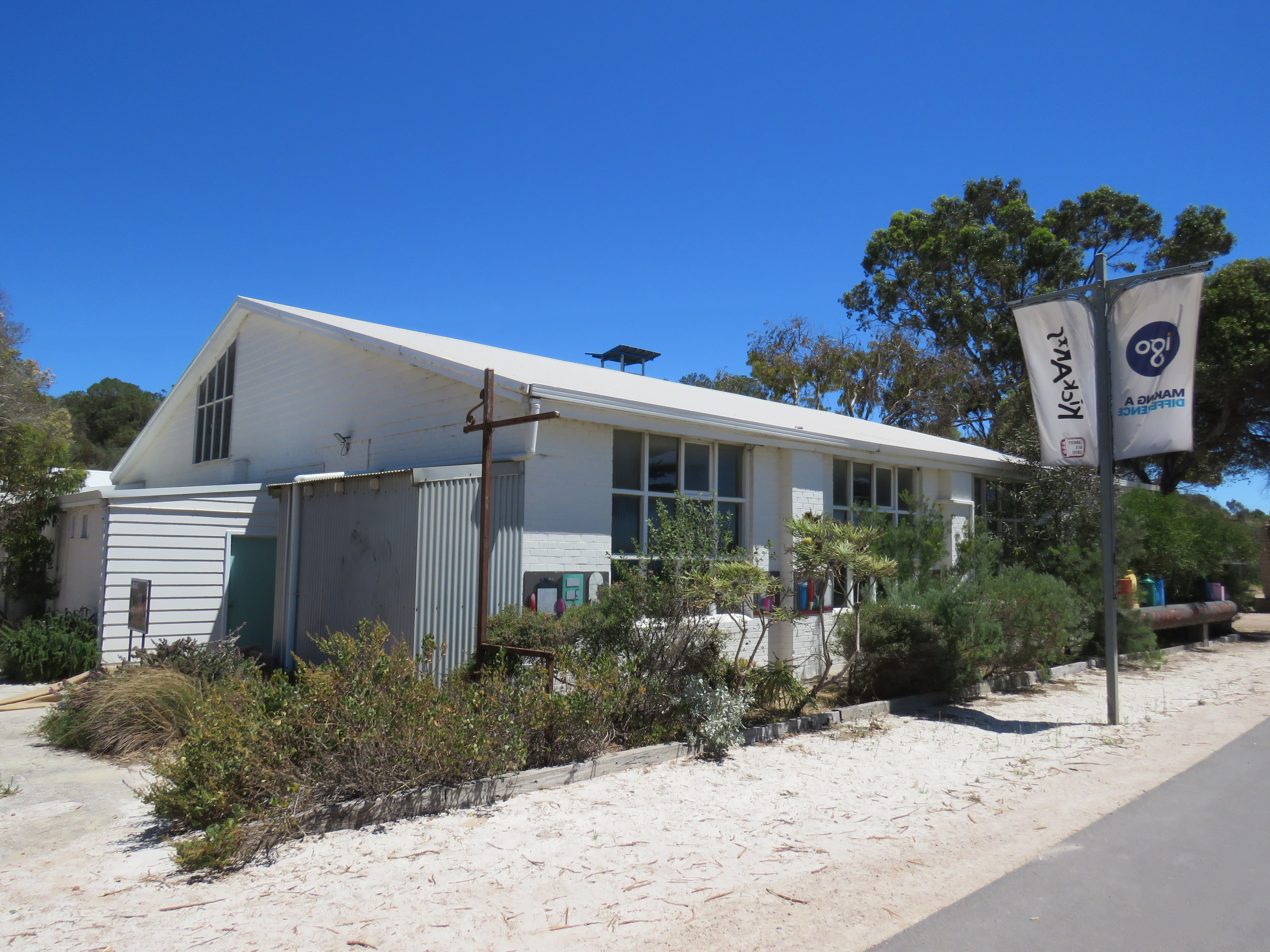
- The State Heritage listed former Esperance Fish Cannery, now the Cannery Arts Centre

- Coordinates: 33°50′24″S 121°53′17″E
- Country: Australia
- State: Western Australia
- City: Esperance
- LGA(s): Shire of Esperance
- Location: 3 km (1.9 mi) N of Esperance

Government
  - State electorate(s): Roe
  - Federal division(s): O'Connor

Area
  - Total: 7.7 km^{2} (3.0 sq mi)

Population
  - Total(s): 164 (SAL 2021)
- Postcode: 6450
Suburbs around Chadwick
Monjingup	Lake Warden	Windabout
Pink Lake	Chadwick	Castletown
Pink Lake	Nulsen	Esperance

Chadwick is a northern suburb of Esperance, a town in south-eastern Western Australia. Its local government area is the Shire of Esperance. The eastern terminus of the South Coast Highway is located in Chadwick.

Chadwick was gazetted in 1971, and at the 2006 census, Chadwick had a population of 165.

The State Heritage listed former Esperance Fish Cannery is located in Chadwick. The cannery was built in 1948 but only functioned as such for one year, and is now an arts centre.
