= Dalyup, Western Australia =

Town and locality in the Shire of Esperance, Western Australia

Dalyup
- Town
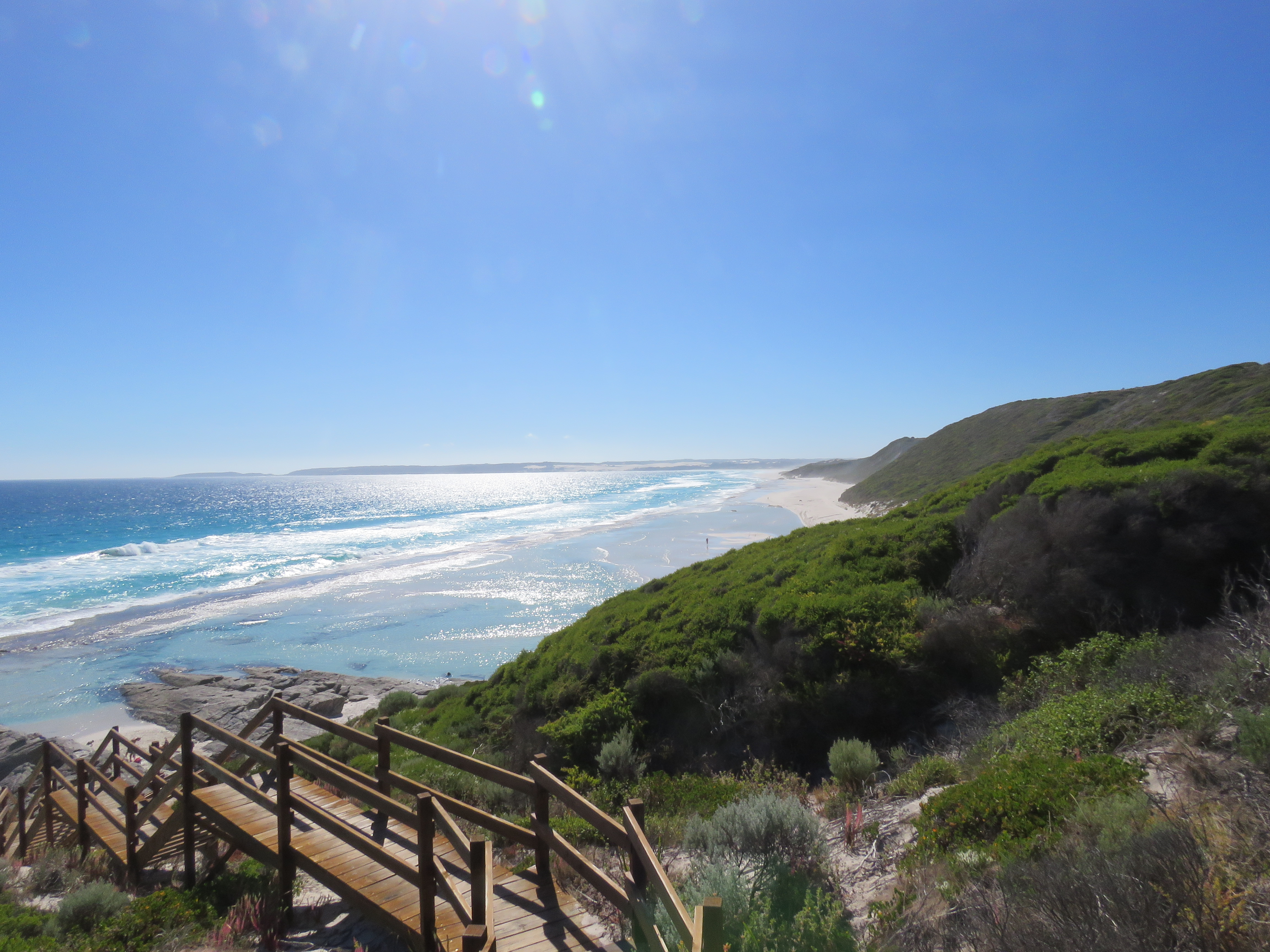
- 11 Mile Beach and access stairs in Dalyup

- Interactive map of Dalyup
- Coordinates: 33.71°S 121.59°E
- Country: Australia
- State: Western Australia
- LGA: Shire of Esperance
- Location: 678 km (421 mi) south east of Perth; 36 km (22 mi) WNW of Esperance
- Established: 1962

Government
  - State electorate: Roe
  - Federal division: O'Connor

Area
  - Total: 731.7 km^{2} (282.5 sq mi)

Population
  - Total: 150 (SAL 2021)
Localities around Dalyup
Lort River	Scaddan	Scaddan
Coomalbidgup	Dalyup	Gibson
	Southern Ocean	Monjingup

Dalyup is a town and locality of the Shire of Esperance in the Goldfields-Esperance region of Western Australia. It is located on the South Coast Highway and the Southern Ocean. The Lake Mortijinup Nature Reserve as well as two unnamed nature reserves are located in Dalyup.

The town takes its name from the adjacent Dalyup River. The name is Aboriginal in origin and was previously thought to be the Noongar word for the western king parrot or hookbill, but more recent research led by Leonard Collard concluded that it "means that at the moment by this location there is an opening into this district".

The townsite was gazetted on 18 May 1962, although there had been agricultural settlement in the area since 1896.

== Nature reserves ==
The following nature reserves are located or partially located within Dalyup. All three are located within the Esperance Plains bioregion:

- Lake Mortijinup Nature Reserve was gazetted on 6 October 1978 and has a size of 4.86 square kilometres (1.88 mi^{2}).
- Unnamed WA32419 Nature Reserve was gazetted on 8 February 1974 and has a size of 7.92 square kilometres (3.06 mi^{2}).
- Unnamed WA36183 Nature Reserve was gazetted on 20 July 1979 and has a size of 3.58 square kilometres (1.38 mi^{2}). It is only partially located within Dalyup.
