= Scaddan, Western Australia =

Town and locality in the Shire of Esperance, Western Australia

Scaddan
- Town
- Coordinates: 33.444°S 121.725°E
- Country: Australia
- State: Western Australia
- LGA(s): Shire of Esperance
- Location: 783 km (487 mi) east of Perth; 52 km (32 mi) NW of Esperance; 150 km (93 mi) south of Norseman
- Established: 1924

Government
  - State electorate(s): Roe
  - Federal division(s): O'Connor

Area
  - Total: 979.6 km^{2} (378.2 sq mi)
- Elevation: 184 m (604 ft)

Population
  - Total(s): 96 (SAL 2021)
- Postcode: 6447
Localities around Scaddan
Lort River	Grass Patch	Mount Ney
Lort River	Scaddan	Wittenoom Hills
Dalyup	Gibson	Neridup

Scaddan is a small town and locality in Western Australia located 783 kilometres (487 mi) east of Perth situated just off the Coolgardie-Esperance Highway between Norseman and Esperance in the Goldfields-Esperance region of Western Australia. The Kendall Road, Speddingup East and Truslove Townsite Nature Reserves are located within Scaddan.

The area was originally known as Thirty Mile, because of its distance from Esperance. Europeans settled the area before 1914 and were commonly using the name Scaddan at around that time. The name of the post office was changed from Thirty Mile to Scaddan in 1915 and by 1916 a school and hall had been built in the town. The government delayed declaring the town until the route of the Norseman–Esperance railway was settled. The townsite was finally gazetted in 1924.

The town is named after John "Happy Jack" Scaddan, the premier of Western Australia from 1911 to 1916 and a prominent advocate of the Esperance railway.

== Nature reserves ==
The following nature reserves are located within Scaddan. Kendall Road and Truslove Townsite Nature Reserves are located within the Mallee bioregion, while the Speddingup East Nature Reserve is located in the Esperance Plains bioregion:

- Kendall Road Nature Reserve was gazetted on 1 December 1967 and has a size of 0.56 square kilometres (0.22 sq mi).
- Speddingup East Nature Reserve was gazetted on 24 May 1968 and has a size of 0.69 square kilometres (0.27 sq mi).
- Truslove Townsite Nature Reserve, only partially located within Scaddan, was gazetted on 4 February 1966 and has a size of 60.66 square kilometres (23.42 sq mi).
