= Cascade, Western Australia =

Locality in the Shire of Esperance, Western Australia

Cascade
- Town
- Interactive map of Cascade
- Coordinates: 33.47°S 121.07°E
- Country: Australia
- State: Western Australia
- LGA: Shire of Esperance
- Location: 677 km (421 mi) east of Perth; 96 km (60 mi) north-west of Esperance
- Established: 1976

Government
  - State electorate: Roe
  - Federal division: O'Connor

Area
  - Total: 1,285.3 km^{2} (496.3 sq mi)
- Elevation: 182 m (597 ft)

Population
  - Total: 103 (SAL 2021)
- Postcode: 6450
Localities around Cascade
Munglinup	North Cascade	North Cascade
Munglinup	Cascade	Lort River
Munglinup	East Munglinup	Coomalbidgup

Cascade is a small town in Western Australia located 677 kilometres (421 mi) east of Perth along the South Coast between Ravensthorpe and Esperance in the Goldfields-Esperance region of Western Australia. The Griffiths, Fields and Cascade Nature Reserves are located within Cascade.

At the 2006 census, Cascade had a population of 158.

The origin of the name is unknown except that it was suggested by the Shire of Esperance. The townsite was gazetted on 19 November 1976.

The main industry in town is wheat farming with the town being a Cooperative Bulk Handling receival site.

== Nature reserves ==
The following nature reserves are located within Cascade. All three are located within the Mallee bioregion:

- Cascade Nature Reserve was gazetted on 2 February 1973 and has a size of 3.84 square kilometres (1.48 mi^{2}).
- Fields Nature Reserve was gazetted on 2 February 1973 and has a size of 11.79 square kilometres (4.55 mi^{2}).
- Griffiths Nature Reserve was gazetted on 16 October 1970 and has a size of 54.18 square kilometres (20.92 mi^{2}).
