= Salmon Gums, Western Australia =

Town and locality in the Shire of Esperance, Western Australia

Salmon Gums
- Town
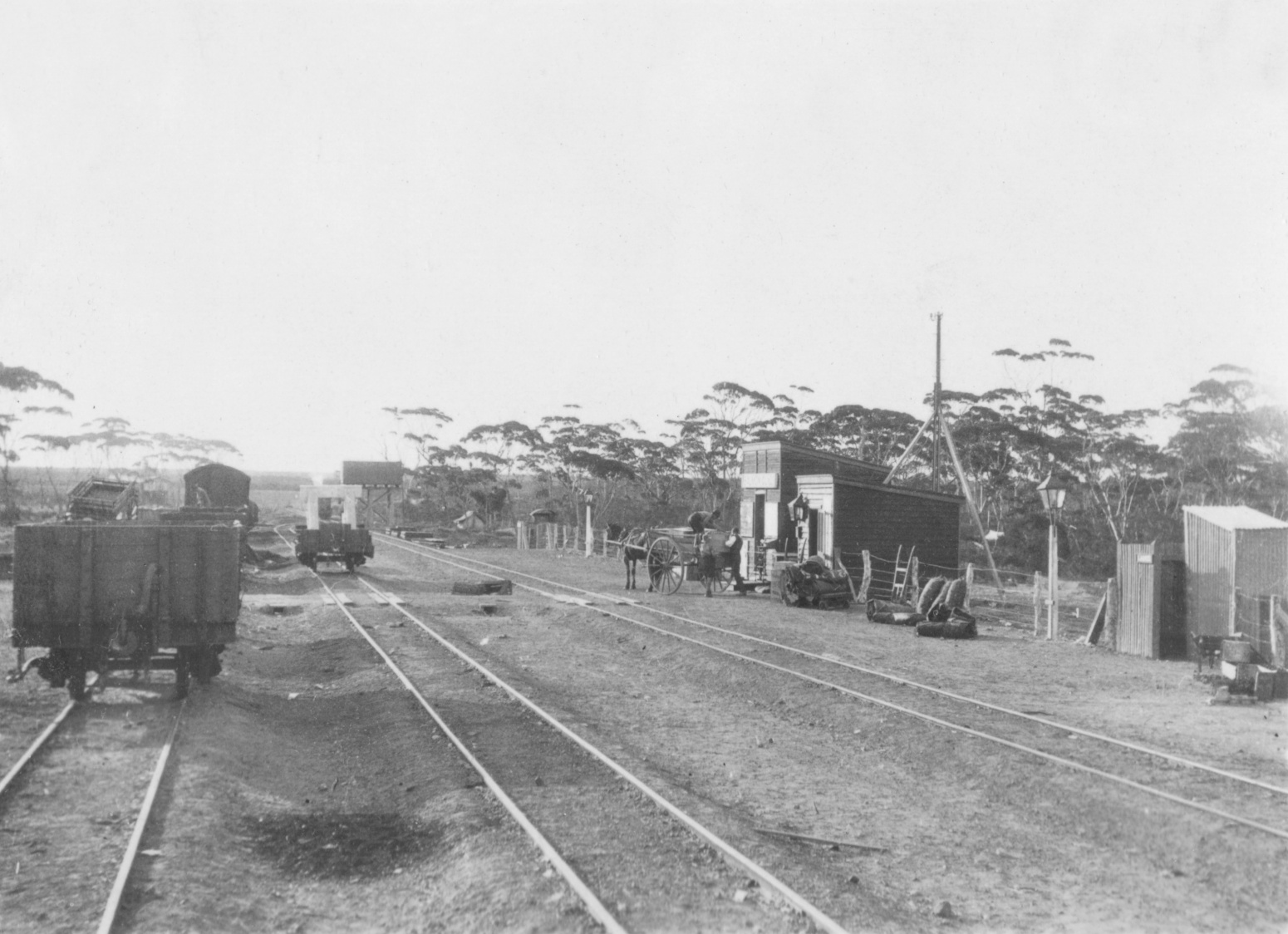
- Salmon Gums railway siding in 1928

- Interactive map of Salmon Gums
- Coordinates: 32.98°S 121.645°E
- Country: Australia
- State: Western Australia
- LGA: Shire of Esperance
- Location: 780 km (480 mi) ESE of Perth; 103 km (64 mi) N of Esperance; 95 km (59 mi) S of Norseman
- Established: 1925

Government
  - State electorate: Roe
  - Federal division: O'Connor

Area
  - Total: 2,781.5 km^{2} (1,073.9 sq mi)
- Elevation: 249 m (817 ft)

Population
  - Total: 146 (SAL 2021)
- Postcode: 6445
- Mean max temp: 24.0 °C (75.2 °F)
- Mean min temp: 9.4 °C (48.9 °F)
- Annual rainfall: 373.5 mm (14.70 in)
Localities around Salmon Gums
Norseman	Dundas	Dundas
North Cascade	Salmon Gums	Buraminya
Lort River	Grass Patch	Buraminya

Salmon Gums is a small town and locality of the Shire of Esperance in the Goldfields-Esperance region of Western Australia, located 106 km north of Esperance on the Coolgardie-Esperance Highway. Apart from the townsite of Salmon Gums, the townsite of Dowak and parts of the Ngadju Indigenous Protected Area are located within Salmon Gums.

The name is derived from a prominent stretch of Eucalyptus salmonophloia (Salmon Gum) trees which formed a landmark in the town's early days. The town is part of the Shire of Esperance.

At the 2016 census, Salmon Gums had a population of 191.

The surrounding areas produce wheat and other cereal crops. The town is a receival site for Cooperative Bulk Handling.

== History ==
The first potential use of a townsite was as a watering spot for the proposed Esperance to Norseman railway, since Salmon Gums is roughly halfway between those two towns. Land for a town-site was set aside in 1912 and the name was recommended in 1916. The land lay within the country of the indigenous Kalaako people. The town was gazetted in 1925, when the Esperance to Salmon Gums section of the railway was completed.

Settlement of the area received a boost after the First World War when returning soldiers were given grants of land in the area, as well as many other locations around the state. The grantees became known as soldier settlers. At the time, Salmon Gums was regarded as being on the fringe of arable land. Low soil fertility and meagre average rainfall meant that yields were poor prior to the 1950s. As a result, the land was not in high demand, so the opportunity cost to the government was quite small.

Agricultural research was boosted prior to the Second World War by the establishment of the Salmon Gums Research Station. In 1949, a similar station, the Esperance Downs Research Station was established near Esperance. Research at the latter place quickly led to the discovery that soil in the Esperance region was deficient in trace elements, reportedly phosphorus, copper and zinc, and the addition of these greatly improved fertility and crop yields. Since then the region, including Salmon Gums, has become a successful producer of wheat, sheep and cattle.

The townsite of Dowak, in the centre of Salmon Gums, on the Coolgardie-Esperance Highway and the railway line, was gazetted in 1928. The Dowak Nature Reserve is located west of the townsite.

== Mining ==
In 2001 a Perth-based iron ore company announced an investigation into a large lignite deposit at Salmon Gums for use reducing its phosphorus-rich iron ore currently being mined at Koolyanobbing. As of 2009, all plans for the mining of the lignite were suspended indefinitely, due to the stock market collapse arising from the 2008 financial crisis. The sudden drop in oil prices made the refinement of the oil suspended in the lignite financially unviable.

== Climate ==
Salmon Gums has a mild semi-arid climate (Köppen BSk). According to both the Köppen and Trewartha classifications for humid climates it is thermally subtropical, the months of January and February exceeding 22 °C (71.6 °F) and all months exceeding 10 °C (50 °F) on average, though by the Köppen criteria for arid climates and the classification used by the Australian Bureau of Meteorology its yearly average (being less than 18 °C (64.4 °F)) is insufficient to qualify as such.

Like many near-coastal areas of Australia, the climate is marked by periodic variations between hot, dry air from the desert interior and cooler, humid air from the ocean. That is exemplified by the significant difference between its average and extreme high temperatures, the 1991–2020 period recording an average yearly record high of 43.0 °C (109.4 °F) the highest-ever being 46.3 °C (115.3 °F) on 28 January 2011 and 20 February 2024.

With its semi-arid climate, relatively high-latitude, and its slightly elevated location lessening the moderating influences of the ocean, Salmon Gums can be one of the coldest places in Western Australia—its record low minimum of −6.1 °C (21.0 °F) on 15 August 1970 is the fourth coldest record low and sixth coldest temperature recorded in the state, while its record low maximum of 5.6 °C (42.1 °F) on 16 July 1946 is tied for the coolest in the state. Per the 1991–2020 normals, the average yearly record low is −3.0 °C (26.6 °F), placing it within USDA hardiness zone 9b and Australian National Botanic Gardens hardiness zone 3. An average of 70 days per year reach or exceed 30 °C (86 °F), putting it within American Horticultural Society heat zone 7.

Precipitation is relatively evenly distributed throughout the year, but tends to be much more erratic in summer, with some heavy rain occasionally occurring during that time.

Climate data for Salmon Gums (1991–2020 normals, 1932–present extremes)
Month	Jan	Feb	Mar	Apr	May	Jun	Jul	Aug	Sep	Oct	Nov	Dec	Year
Record high °C (°F)	46.3 (115.3)	46.3 (115.3)	43.2 (109.8)	39.5 (103.1)	32.5 (90.5)	32.2 (90.0)	29.4 (84.9)	32.0 (89.6)	37.5 (99.5)	39.5 (103.1)	45.0 (113.0)	45.3 (113.5)	46.3 (115.3)
Mean daily maximum °C (°F)	31.0 (87.8)	29.9 (85.8)	27.4 (81.3)	24.7 (76.5)	20.5 (68.9)	17.6 (63.7)	16.8 (62.2)	18.1 (64.6)	20.8 (69.4)	24.4 (75.9)	27.1 (80.8)	29.5 (85.1)	24.0 (75.2)
Mean daily minimum °C (°F)	14.3 (57.7)	14.5 (58.1)	13.0 (55.4)	10.6 (51.1)	7.4 (45.3)	5.8 (42.4)	5.1 (41.2)	5.1 (41.2)	5.8 (42.4)	8.1 (46.6)	10.6 (51.1)	12.3 (54.1)	9.4 (48.9)
Record low °C (°F)	3.0 (37.4)	3.0 (37.4)	−0.4 (31.3)	−1.6 (29.1)	−2.5 (27.5)	−5.7 (21.7)	−4.4 (24.1)	−6.1 (21.0)	−5.5 (22.1)	−2.8 (27.0)	−1.2 (29.8)	1.0 (33.8)	−6.1 (21.0)
Average rainfall mm (inches)	35.9 (1.41)	28.3 (1.11)	34.5 (1.36)	27.3 (1.07)	30.6 (1.20)	30.7 (1.21)	36.1 (1.42)	38.3 (1.51)	33.4 (1.31)	27.4 (1.08)	29.0 (1.14)	22.0 (0.87)	373.5 (14.69)
Average rainy days (≥ 0.2mm)	5.0	5.2	6.7	7.1	10.0	11.9	13.6	13.3	10.9	7.7	7.2	5.7	104.3
Source: Bureau of Meteorology
