= Esperance railway line =

Railway line in Western Australia

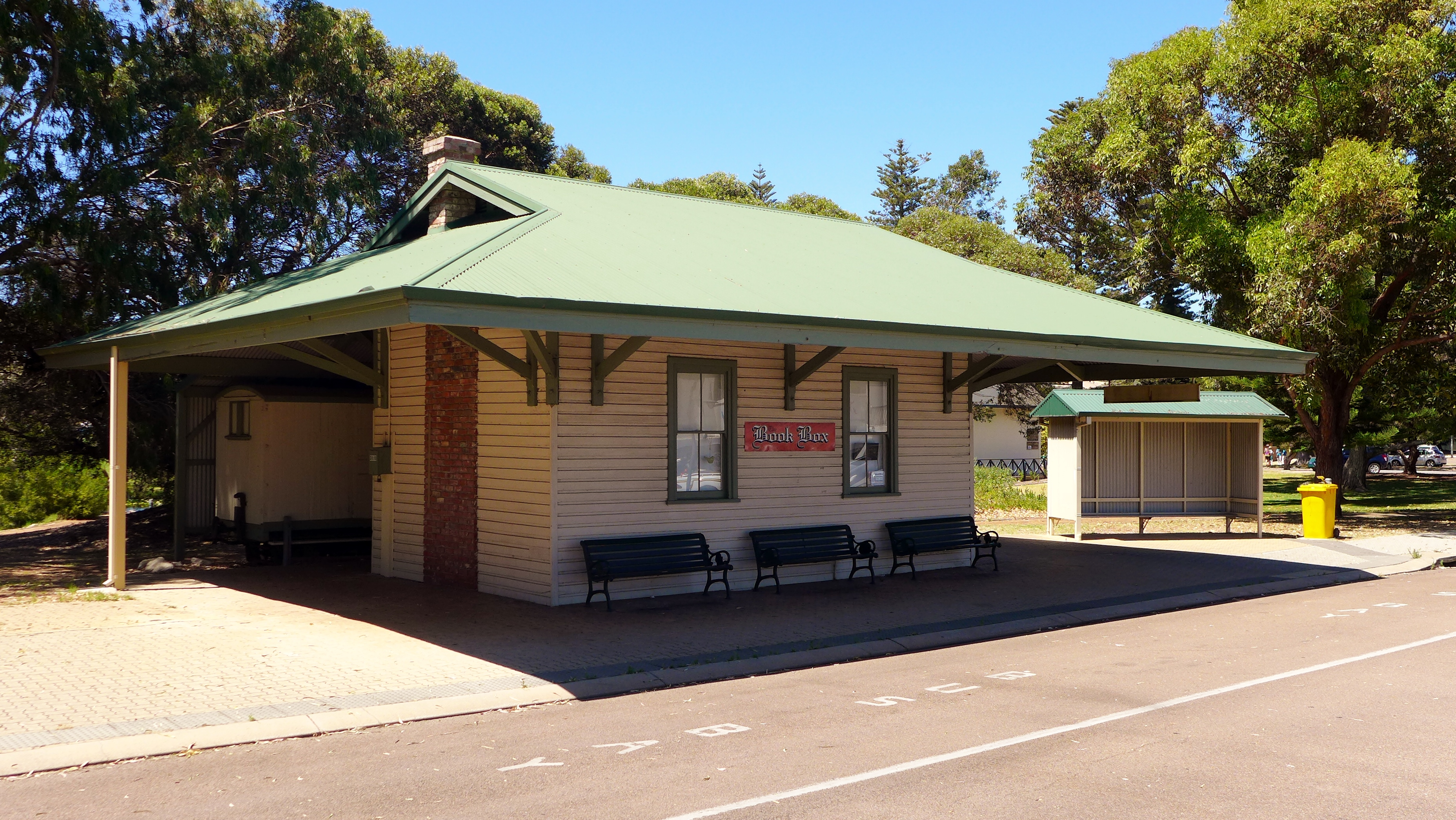
- The former station master's office in Esperance, 2019

Overview
- Termini: Coolgardie (NG) and Kalgoorlie (SG); Esperance

Technical
- Track gauge: 1,435 mm (4 ft 8 1/2 in) standard gauge
- Old gauge: Narrow gauge
- Signalling: Train Order Working
- Highest elevation: 378.8 m (1,243 ft)
- Esperance branch railway Main locations

The Esperance railway line runs from Kalgoorlie to Esperance in Western Australia.

It was lobbied for by Esperance residents to be linked into the Western Australian Government Railways railway network to provide land transport to their region.

In the strictest terms it was an extension of the Eastern Goldfields Railway, but following the Standard Gauge project in the 1960s it has run from Kalgoorlie to Esperance since the mid-1970s, as Coolgardie is no longer connected by rail.

== Sub-divisions/sections ==
- Coolgardie–Widgiemooltha – 82.8 kilometres (51.48 mi), completed in 1908.
- Widgiemooltha–Norseman – 91.3 kilometres (56.74 mi), completed in 1909.
- Norseman–Salmon Gums – 94.3 kilometres (58.58 mi), completed in 1927.
- Salmon Gums–Esperance – 105.7 kilometres (65.70 mi), completed in 1925.

== Steam-era water supplies ==
During the time the narrow-gauge railway was in operation, due to the distances through dry country, dams and tanks were of importance to supply the steam engines in operation.

Between Coolgardie and Esperance, water supply sources were from Water Supply Department (Coolgardie), Mines Department Dam (Widgiemooltha), and WAGR dams. Early WAGR annual reports took into consideration: Catchment area, Capacity, Pumped or gravitation collection of water, estimated loss by evaporation and absorption, and total amount of water stored.

== Esperance Flyer ==
This passenger train started in 1932. It was five hours faster than the mixed goods train, though averaging only about 35 km/h (22 mph). Trains were sped up by a further 1½ hours when diesels took over in 1954. By 1967 a bus had replaced the train.

== Gauge and route ==
The line was originally built as narrow gauge, but with gauge standardisation of the main interstate railway in the late 1960s, it was converted to standard gauge, so as not to become a gauge orphan. The route was also changed somewhat with standardisation, with a junction at Kalgoorlie replacing the junction at Coolgardie. Gauge conversion of the line was completed in the mid-1970s.

== Acts of Parliament ==
The following acts of Parliament are associated with the railway line:

- Coolgardie–Norseman Railway Act 1906, assented to on 14 December 1906, authorised the construction of the railway line from Coolgardie to Norseman.
- Esperance Northwards Railway Act 1914, assented to on 10 February 1915, authorised construction of a 97-kilometre-long (60 mi) railway line northwards from Esperance.
- Esperance Northwards Railway Extension Act 1922, assented to on 30 December 1922, authorised the construction of a 10-kilometre (6.2 mi) railway line extension to Salmon Gums.
- Norseman–Salmon Gums Railway Act 1924, assented to on 31 December 1924, authorised the construction of the railway line from Norseman to Salmon Gums.
- Lake Lefroy (Coolgardie–Esperance Wharf) Railway Act 1969, assented to on 21 May 1969, authorised the construction of a railway line to connect the Esperance Branch Railway to the Esperance land backed wharf and construction of a spur railway to Lake Lefroy.

== Selected stopping locations ==
- Grass Patch
- Scaddan
- Gibson – 1,800-metre (5,900 ft) crossing loop built 2009.
- Esperance

== Elevation ==
The railway line starts at an elevation of 378 metres (1,240 ft) at Kalgoorlie and finishes at Esperance at an elevation of 3.3 metres (11 ft). It reaches its lowest point of 3.2 metres (10 ft) at the 385.8-kilometre (239.7 mi) mark, just before the terminus at Esperance, and its highest point of 378.8 metres (1,243 ft) at the 25.3-kilometre (15.7 mi) mark, south of Hampton.
