= Shire of Esperance =

Coordinates: 33°51′40″S 121°53′31″E

- Local government area
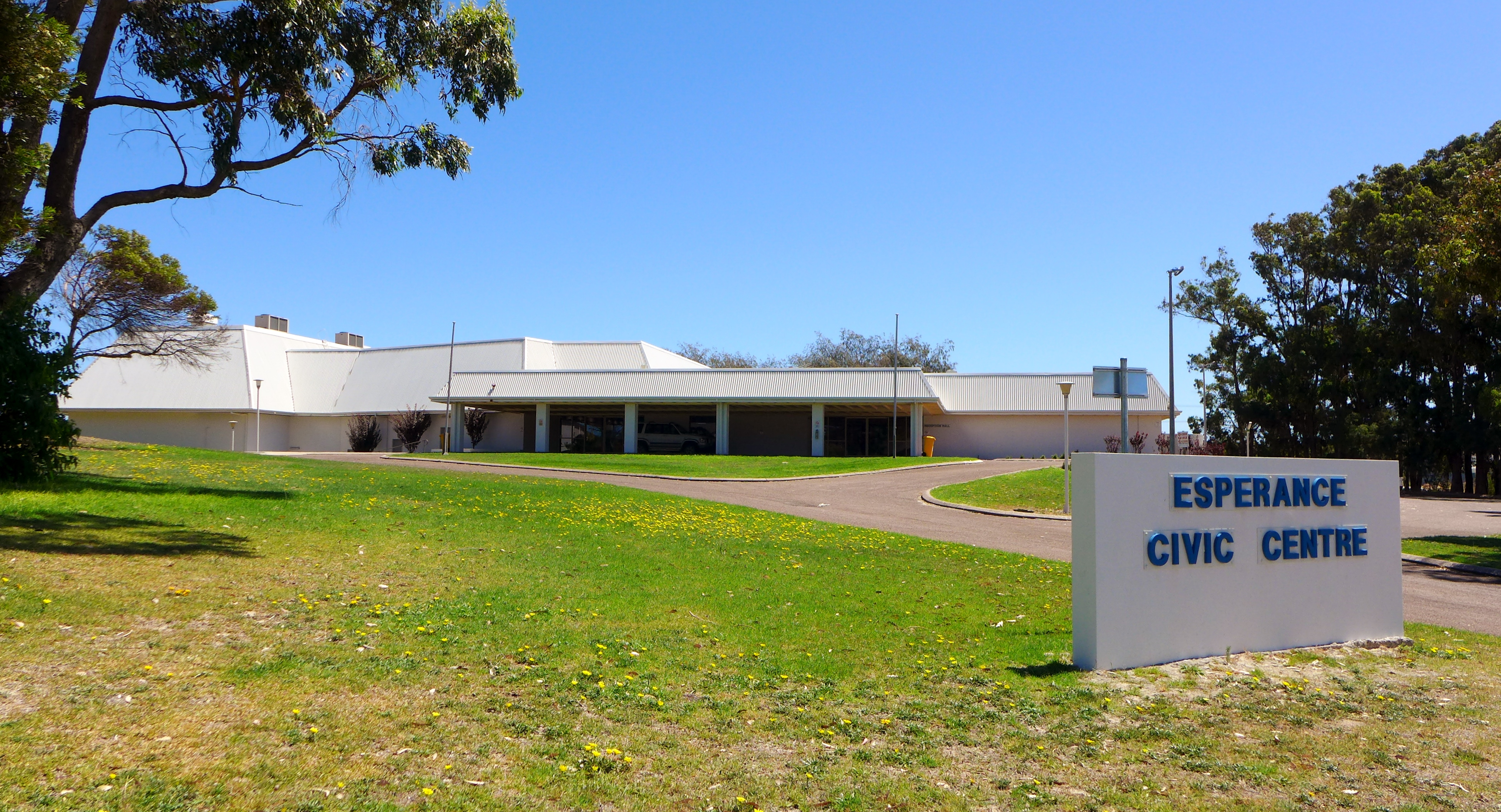
- Esperance Civic Centre, 2019

- Interactive map of Shire of Esperance
- Country: Australia
- State: Western Australia
- Region: Goldfields–Esperance
- Established: 1895
- Council seat: Esperance

Government
  - Shire President: Ron Chambers
  - State electorate: Roe
  - Federal division: O'Connor

Area
  - Total: 42,546.9 km^{2} (16,427.4 sq mi)

Population
  - Total: 13,883 (LGA 2021)
- Website: Shire of Esperance
LGAs around Shire of Esperance
Dundas	Dundas	Dundas
Ravensthorpe	Shire of Esperance	Dundas
Southern Ocean	Southern Ocean	Southern Ocean

The Shire of Esperance is a local government area in the Goldfields–Esperance region of Western Australia, about 400 kilometres (250 mi) south of the city of Kalgoorlie and about 720 kilometres (450 mi) east-southeast of the state capital, Perth. The Shire covers an area of 42,547 square kilometres (16,427 sq mi), and its seat of government is the town of Esperance, where about three-quarters of the Shire's population resides.

== History ==
The Esperance Road District was established on 13 September 1895. Two weeks later, on 27 September 1895, the township of Esperance separated from the road district as the Municipality of Esperance. The municipality was re-absorbed into the road district on 30 October 1908. On 1 July 1961, it became the Shire of Esperance under the Local Government Act 1960, which reformed all remaining road districts into shires.

A railway line from Coolgardie to Esperance that was completed in 1927 led to development of farming in the mallee country to the north of Esperance.

On 11 July 1979, the American Skylab Space Station re-entered Earth's atmosphere headed for Western Australia and the Indian Ocean. It broke up during reentry and much of it landed in Esperance. In turn, the Shire issued a facetious A$400 fine to NASA for littering. It remained outstanding until April 2009, when radio show host Scott Barley of Highway Radio raised the funds from his morning show listeners, and paid the fine on behalf of NASA.

The main industry in the region is farming. The Department of Agriculture established a research station at Gibson finding the local soils to be deficient in trace elements and nitrogen. In 1953 there were 130 farms in the area, increasing to 347 in 1961 and over 650 in 1968.

== Indigenous people ==
The traditional owners of the lands encompassed by the Shire are the Wudjari people of the Noongar nation and the Ngadju people.

The Wudjari's traditional lands occupy most of the shire but the eastern tribes of the Wudjari, the Njunga, are seen as a separate people for cultural reasons, having adopted different cultural practices. The Ngadju's traditional lands are in the east of the shire, along the Israelite Bay, up to Point Malcolm, with some historical conflict between them and the Njunga over the boundaries of the two people.

== Wards ==
The shire is divided into two wards. Prior to the 2005 elections, a 13-councillor setup with North, West and East wards each with two councillors was in place. The shire president is elected from amongst the councillors.

- Town Ward (six councillors)
- Rural Ward (three councillors)

== Towns and localities ==
The towns and localities of the Shire of Esperance, divided into 32 localities, with population and size figures based on the most recent Australian census:

Suburb	Population	Area	Map
Bandy Creek	383 (SAL 2021)	34.3 km^{2} (13.2 sq mi)	
Beaumont	53 (SAL 2021)	1,753 km^{2} (677 sq mi)	
Boyatup	28 (SAL 2021)	791.2 km^{2} (305.5 sq mi)	
Buraminya	0 (SAL 2016)	13,493.8 km^{2} (5,210.0 sq mi)	
Cape Arid	4 (SAL 2021)	2,778.3 km^{2} (1,072.7 sq mi)	
Cape Le Grand	0 (SAL 2021)	308.9 km^{2} (119.3 sq mi)	
Cascade	103 (SAL 2021)	1,285.3 km^{2} (496.3 sq mi)	
Castletown	3,968 (SAL 2021)	3.6 km^{2} (1.4 sq mi)	
Chadwick	164 (SAL 2021)	7.7 km^{2} (3.0 sq mi)	
Condingup	280 (SAL 2021)	1,069.6 km^{2} (413.0 sq mi)	
Coomalbidgup	136 (SAL 2021)	1,137.7 km^{2} (439.3 sq mi)	
Dalyup	150 (SAL 2021)	731.7 km^{2} (282.5 sq mi)	
East Munglinup	39 (SAL 2021)	788.8 km^{2} (304.6 sq mi)	
Esperance	2,080 (SAL 2021)	2.42 km^{2} (0.93 sq mi)	
Gibson	406 (SAL 2021)	735.3 km^{2} (283.9 sq mi)	
Grass Patch	113 (SAL 2021)	1,481.5 km^{2} (572.0 sq mi)	
Howick	45 (SAL 2021)	1,133.7 km^{2} (437.7 sq mi)	
Israelite Bay	0 (SAL 2016)	2,098.5 km^{2} (810.2 sq mi)	
Lort River	60 (SAL 2021)	1,032 km^{2} (398 sq mi)	
Merivale	87 (SAL 2021)	444.1 km^{2} (171.5 sq mi)	
Monjingup	394 (SAL 2021)	182.5 km^{2} (70.5 sq mi)	
Mount Ney	8 (SAL 2021)	1,018.9 km^{2} (393.4 sq mi)	
Myrup	518 (SAL 2021)	147.1 km^{2} (56.8 sq mi)	
Neridup	92 (SAL 2021)	859.4 km^{2} (331.8 sq mi)	
North Cascade	14 (SAL 2021)	6,896.7 km^{2} (2,662.8 sq mi)	
Nulsen	1,083 (SAL 2021)	2.4 km^{2} (0.93 sq mi)	
Pink Lake	1,042 (SAL 2021)	44 km^{2} (17 sq mi)	
Salmon Gums	146 (SAL 2021)	2,781.5 km^{2} (1,073.9 sq mi)	
Scaddan	96 (SAL 2021)	979.6 km^{2} (378.2 sq mi)	
Sinclair	765 (SAL 2021)	1.5 km^{2} (0.58 sq mi)	
West Beach	1,483 (SAL 2021)	21.1 km^{2} (8.1 sq mi)	
Windabout	124 (SAL 2021)	4 km^{2} (1.5 sq mi)	
Wittenoom Hills	16 (SAL 2021)	549.7 km^{2} (212.2 sq mi)	

== Heritage-listed places ==
As of 2023, 92 places are heritage-listed in the Shire of Esperance, of which twelve are on the State Register of Heritage Places.
