= Hibiscus cravenii =

Conservation status
- Vulnerable (EPBC Act)

Scientific classification
- Kingdom: Plantae
- Clade: Tracheophytes
- Clade: Angiosperms
- Clade: Eudicots
- Clade: Rosids
- Order: Malvales
- Family: Malvaceae
- Genus: Hibiscus
- Species: H. cravenii

Binomial name
- Hibiscus cravenii (Fryxell) B.E.Pfeil & Craven

Synonyms
- Alyogyne cravenii Fryxell

Species of plant

Hibiscus cravenii is a species of flowering plant in the mallow family, Malvaceae, that is endemic to the Northern Territory in Australia.

== Description ==
Hibiscus cravenii is a shrub in the family Malvaceae, growing to a height of 3 m. Its branchlets with are densely hairy with stellate hairs 0.2–0.8 mm long. The leaves, the epicalyx and the calyx are also densely hairy with stellate hairs. The stipules fall off (are deciduous), and of length 4–6 mm. The Petiole is up to 2.5 cm long. The leaf blade is ovate and not lobed (15 cm long by 19 cm wide). There is no leaf nectary. The leaf is palmately 7 nerved, of the same colour on both upper and lower surfaces (concolorous), with a truncate base, an acute apex, and having serrate margins. The flowers are solitary in the upper axils on pedicels 5–20 mm long. The petals are sparsely stellate on both surfaces, about 4 cm long, and mauve. The staminal column is about 17 mm long, with filaments 1–2 mm long. There is a single style. The seed is kidney-shaped, covered in short hairs and 2.5–3 mm long.

== Distribution and habitat ==
It is endemic to Keep River NP in NT in the Victoria Bonaparte bioregion, growing on the deeper sandy soils of a small valley floor amongst sandstone ranges.

== Ecology ==
It flowers from May to July, fruiting from June to December.

== Taxonomy ==
Hibiscus cravenii was first described by Paul Fryxell in 1987 as Alogyne cravenii., but was placed in the genus, Hibiscus, in 2004 by Bernard Pfeil and Lyndley Craven.
