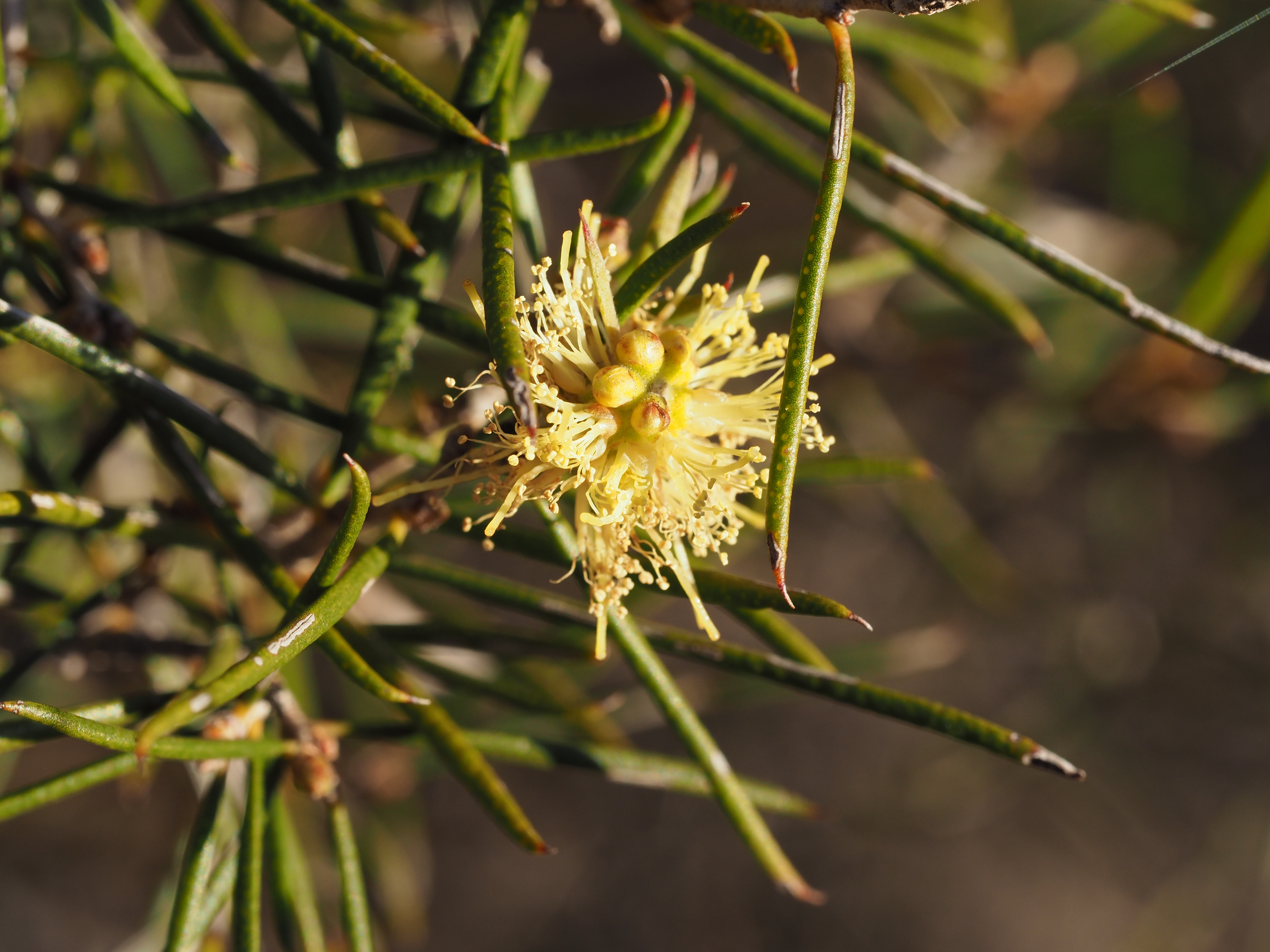

Scientific classification
- Kingdom: Plantae
- Clade: Tracheophytes
- Clade: Angiosperms
- Clade: Eudicots
- Clade: Rosids
- Order: Myrtales
- Family: Myrtaceae
- Genus: Melaleuca
- Species: M. interioris

Binomial name
- Melaleuca interioris Craven & Lepschi

= Melaleuca interioris =

Species of flowering plant

Melaleuca interioris is a plant in the myrtle family, Myrtaceae and is endemic to Western Australia, South Australia, Queensland, New South Wales and the Northern Territory. It was formerly included in Melaleuca uncinata and is similar to that species with its cylinder-shaped leaves and small heads of yellow flowers, but with smaller, less compressed fruiting capsules.

== Description ==
Melaleuca interioris is a shrub growing to 3 m (10 ft) tall with papery bark. Its leaves are spreading or erect and are 6–56 mm (0.2–2 in) long, 06–1.2 mm (0.2–0.05 in) wide, linear in shape, roughly circular to oblong in cross-section and end in a sharp point.

The flowers are yellow and are arranged in heads which are composed of 4 to 9 groups of flowers in threes. The petals are 1.1–1.3 mm (0.04–0.05 in) long, circular to egg-shaped and fall off as the flower opens. There are five bundles of stamens around the flower, each with 4 to 9 stamens. Flowering occurs between August and November and is followed by fruit which are woody capsules, 3.8–8 mm (0.1–0.3 in) wide, about the same length as width. The capsules remain separate from each other (whereas in Melaleuca uncinata they tend to become compressed together so that they look like a single fruit).

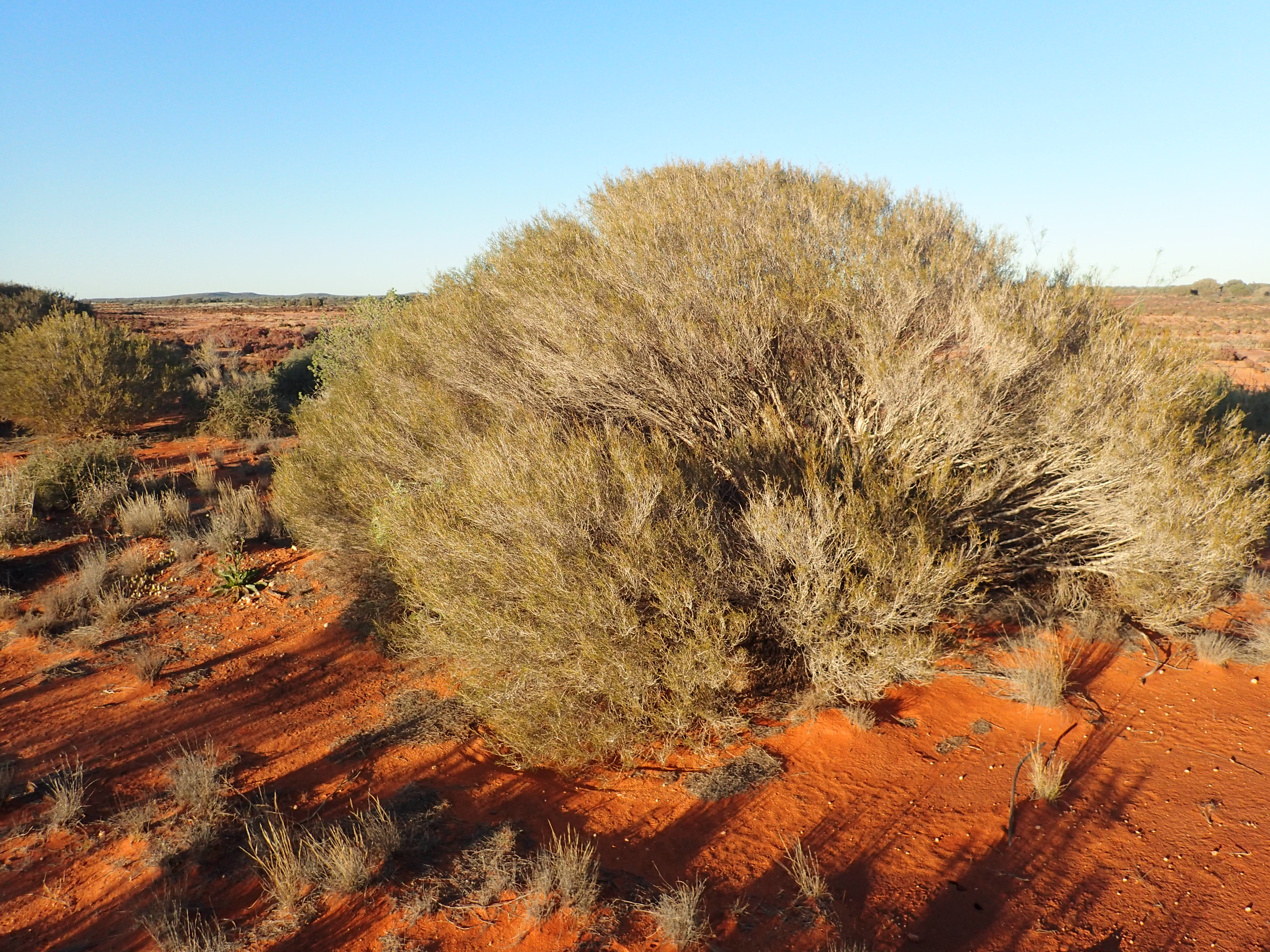
Habit near Lake Raeside

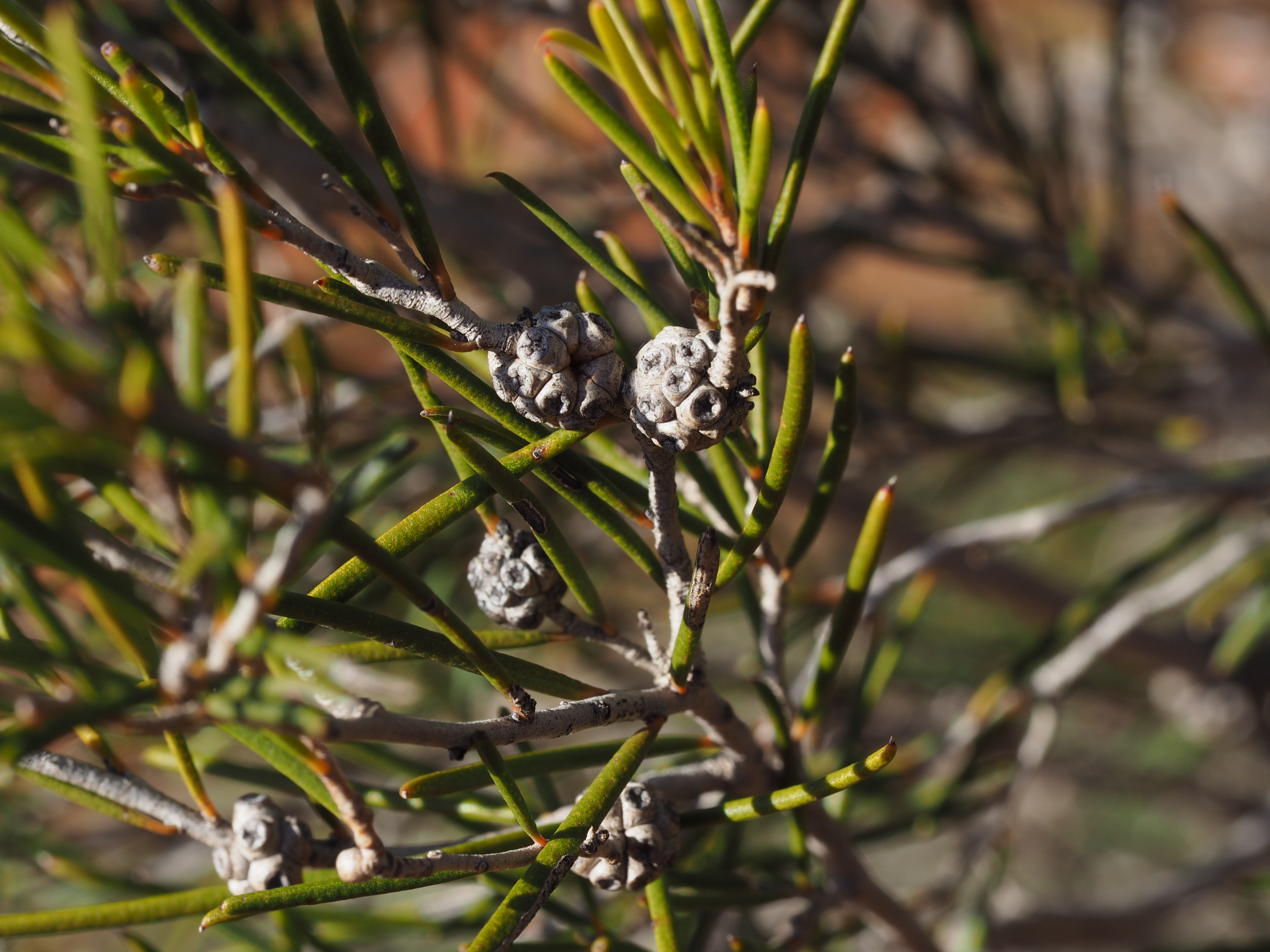
Fruit

== Taxonomy and naming ==
Melaleuca interioris was first formally described in 2004 by Lyndley Craven and Brendan Lepschi in Australian Systematic Botany from a specimen collected 134 kilometres (80 mi) north of Leinster in Western Australia. The specific epithet (interioris) refers to the interior of Australia, where this species is found.

== Distribution and habitat ==
This melaleuca occurs in the central parts of Western Australia, the central parts of South Australia, the southern half of the Northern Territory, far west of New South Wales and the far south-west corner of Queensland. It grows in shrubland in red sand on the edges of salt lakes, and near ephemeral creeks, claypans and floodplains.

== Conservation status ==
Melaleuca interioris is listed as not threatened by the Government of Western Australia Department of Parks and Wildlife.

== Uses in agriculture ==
Melaleuca interioris and related species of melaleucas such as M. uncinata and M. atroviridis can be used to protect property from wind and water erosion, reduce salinity and waterlogging, provide wildlife habitat and provide income by harvesting for brushwood fencing.
