= Melaleuca stipitata =

Scientific classification
- Kingdom: Plantae
- Clade: Tracheophytes
- Clade: Angiosperms
- Clade: Eudicots
- Clade: Rosids
- Order: Myrtales
- Family: Myrtaceae
- Genus: Melaleuca
- Species: M. stipitata

Binomial name
- Melaleuca stipitata (K.J.Cowley) Craven

Species of flowering plant

Melaleuca stipitata is a plant in the myrtle family, Myrtaceae and is endemic to a small area in the Northern Territory of Australia. It is a rare species, only discovered in 1991 and is unusual in that it is the only known example of Melaleuca having stalked flowers. Its leaves have an essential oil with a pleasant, lemon scent possibly suitable for commercial production.

== Description ==
Melaleuca stipitata is a shrub or tree growing to about 4 m (10 ft) tall with grey, papery bark and glabrous branches and twigs. Its leaves are arranged alternately and are 18.5–75 mm (0.7–3 in) long, 0.8–4.8 mm (0.03–0.2 in) wide and leaves that are flat and narrow but otherwise variable in shape.

The flowers are white or cream-coloured and are arranged in spikes on the ends of branches which sometimes continue to grow after flowering. The spikes are up to 15 mm (0.6 in) in diameter with 3 to 12 groups of flowers in threes and there are often leaves amongst the flower in the spike. The petals are 1.5–1.8 mm (0.06–0.07 in) long and fall off as the flower matures. The floral cup (the hypanthium) has a short stalk - an unusual feature for a melaleuca. Flowering occurs in December and is followed by fruit which are woody, cup-shaped capsules, 2.2–3 mm (0.09–0.1 in) long.

== Taxonomy and naming ==
Melaleuca stipitata was first formally described in 1997 by Lyndley Craven and Bryan Barlow in Novon from a specimen collected below the Bukbukluk Lookout along the Kakadu Highway. The specific epithet (stipitata) is a Neo-Latin word meaning "borne on a stalk" referring to the unusual stalked hypanthium of the flowers.

== Distribution and habitat ==
This melaleuca occurs in the Bukbukluk area in the Kakadu National Park. It grows in woodland on shaly slopes.

== Use as a source of essential oils ==
The oil extracted from the leaves of Melaleuca stipitata is lemon scented. It consists mainly of monoterpenoids which in turn contain about 43% the isomers of citral (neral and geranial), and 10% terpinen-4-ol. It is possible that this plant may be suitable for commercial development because of the antimicrobial properties of these compounds.
