= Lyndley Craven =

Australian botanist (1945–2014)

Lyndley Alan Craven
- Born: September 3, 1945; Australia
- Died: July 11, 2014 (aged 68); Canberra
- Scientific career
- Fields: Botany
- Author abbrev. (botany): Craven

Lyndley Alan Craven (3 September 1945 – 11 July 2014) was a botanist who became the Principal Research Scientist of the Australian National Herbarium. The standard author abbreviation Craven is used to indicate this person as the author when citing a botanical name.

Lyndley ("Lyn") Craven worked for the CSIRO plant taxonomy unit of the New Guinea Survey Group, Division of Land Research and Regional Survey from 1964 to 1967. This was part of a unit that became the Australian National Herbarium, Centre for Australian National Biodiversity Research. Craven's duties included botanical support for land resources surveys.

Craven then left to study horticulture at Burnley Horticultural College, Victoria, earning the degree of Diploma of Horticultural Science in 1970 before being briefly employed by the Parks and Gardens Branch of Department of the Interior, Canberra. Part of this department later became the Canberra Botanic Garden and eventually the Australian National Herbarium, Centre for Australian National Biodiversity Research at the Australian National Botanic Gardens. In 1984, he earned the degree of Master of Science from Macquarie University. Craven was employed by the CSIRO at the National Herbarium from 1971, until his retirement in 2009 from the position of Principal Research Scientist.

Craven continued his association with CSIRO as a post-retirement fellow, working actively on a range of taxonomic projects.

Craven worked on the genera Melaleuca and Syzygium (family Myrtaceae) and related groups, as well as Australian representatives of the genera Hibiscus and Gossypium. He had many other interests including the herbarium library, botanical Latin, and agrihorticultural botany. Plant collecting was also a high priority.

Hibbertia cravenii, Rhododendron cravenii, Goodenia cravenii, Hibiscus cravenii, Hygrochloa cravenii, Grevillea cravenii, Xanthoparmelia cravenii, Eugenia craveniana, Syzygium cravenii, Pittosporum cravenianum, Melicope cravenii and Rhaphidophora cravenschoddeana were named in honour of Craven, the last also honouring Richard Schodde.

== Published works ==
- "Physiological, anatomical and biochemical characterisation of photosynthetic types in genus Cleome (Cleomaceae)". Functional Plant Biology. Volume 34, Number 4. 2007.
- "Callistemon of New Caledonia transferred to Melaleuca (Myrtaceae)".
- "Australian representatives of Macrostelia transferred to Hibiscus (Malvaceae), with the description of a new species".
- Brophy, Joseph J.; Craven, Lyndley A.; Doran, John C. (2013). Melaleucas: their botany, essential oils and uses. Canberra: Australian Centre for International Agricultural Research. ISBN 978-1-922137-51-7.
- Craven, L.A.; Cowie, I.D. (2013). "Taxonomic notes on the broad-leaved paperbarks (Myrtaceae, Melaleuca), including the description of one new species from northern Australia and a key to all taxa". Blumea - Biodiversity, Evolution and Biogeography of Plants. 57 (3): 207–209. doi:10.3767/000651913X662470. ISSN 0006-5196. pdf
- Craven, L.A.; Miller, C.; White, R.G. (2006). "A New Name and Notes on Extra-Floral Nectaries, in Lagunaria (Malvaceae, Malvoideae)". Blumea - Biodiversity, Evolution and Biogeography of Plants. 51 (2). Naturalis Biodiversity Center: 345–353. doi:10.3767/000651906X622283 – via Ingenta Connect. pdf

== Species named ==
Craven is the taxon authority for 591 published names, some of which are listed below.

- Glycine albicans
- Glycine hirticaulis
- Glycine lactovirens
- Glycine pindanica
- Hibiscus aneuthe
- Hibiscus aphelus
- Hibiscus bacalusius
- Hibiscus cravenii
- Hibiscus fallax
- Hibiscus marenitensis
- Hibiscus reflexus
- Hibiscus saponarius
- Hibiscus squarrulosus
- Hibiscus stewartii
- Lagunaria queenslandica
- Melaleuca amydra
- Melaleuca atroviridis
- Melaleuca barlowii
- Melaleuca beardii
- Melaleuca boeophylla
- Melaleuca borealis
- Melaleuca brophyi
- Melaleuca caeca
- Melaleuca calyptroides
- Melaleuca campanae
- Melaleuca carrii
- Melaleuca clavifolia
- Melaleuca croxfordiae
- Melaleuca delta
- Melaleuca dempta
- Melaleuca eulobata
- Melaleuca eurystoma
- Melaleuca eximia
- Melaleuca exuvia
- Melaleuca fabri
- Melaleuca glena
- Melaleuca grieveana
- Melaleuca halophila
- Melaleuca hnatiukii
- Melaleuca hollidayi
- Melaleuca huttensis
- Melaleuca idana
- Melaleuca interioris
- Melaleuca johnsonii
- Melaleuca keigheryi
- Melaleuca laetifica
- Melaleuca lara
- Melaleuca leuropoma
- Melaleuca linguiformis
- Melaleuca longistaminea
- Melaleuca monantha
- Melaleuca nematophylla
- Melaleuca orbicularis
- Melaleuca osullivanii
- Melaleuca papillosa
- Melaleuca penicula
- Melaleuca phoidophylla
- Melaleuca podiocarpa
- Melaleuca procera
- Melaleuca ryeae
- Melaleuca sapientes
- Melaleuca scalena
- Melaleuca similis
- Melaleuca societatis
- Melaleuca squamophloia
- Melaleuca stereophloia
- Melaleuca stipitata
- Melaleuca stramentosa
- Melaleuca sylvana
- Melaleuca systena
- Melaleuca thapsina
- Melaleuca tinkeri
- Melaleuca uxorum
- Melaleuca venusta
- Melaleuca villosisepala
- Melaleuca vinnula
- Melaleuca wonganensis
- Melaleuca zeteticorum
- Melaleuca zonalis

See also Category:Taxa named by Lyndley Craven

== Species assessed ==
- Lithops hermetica
