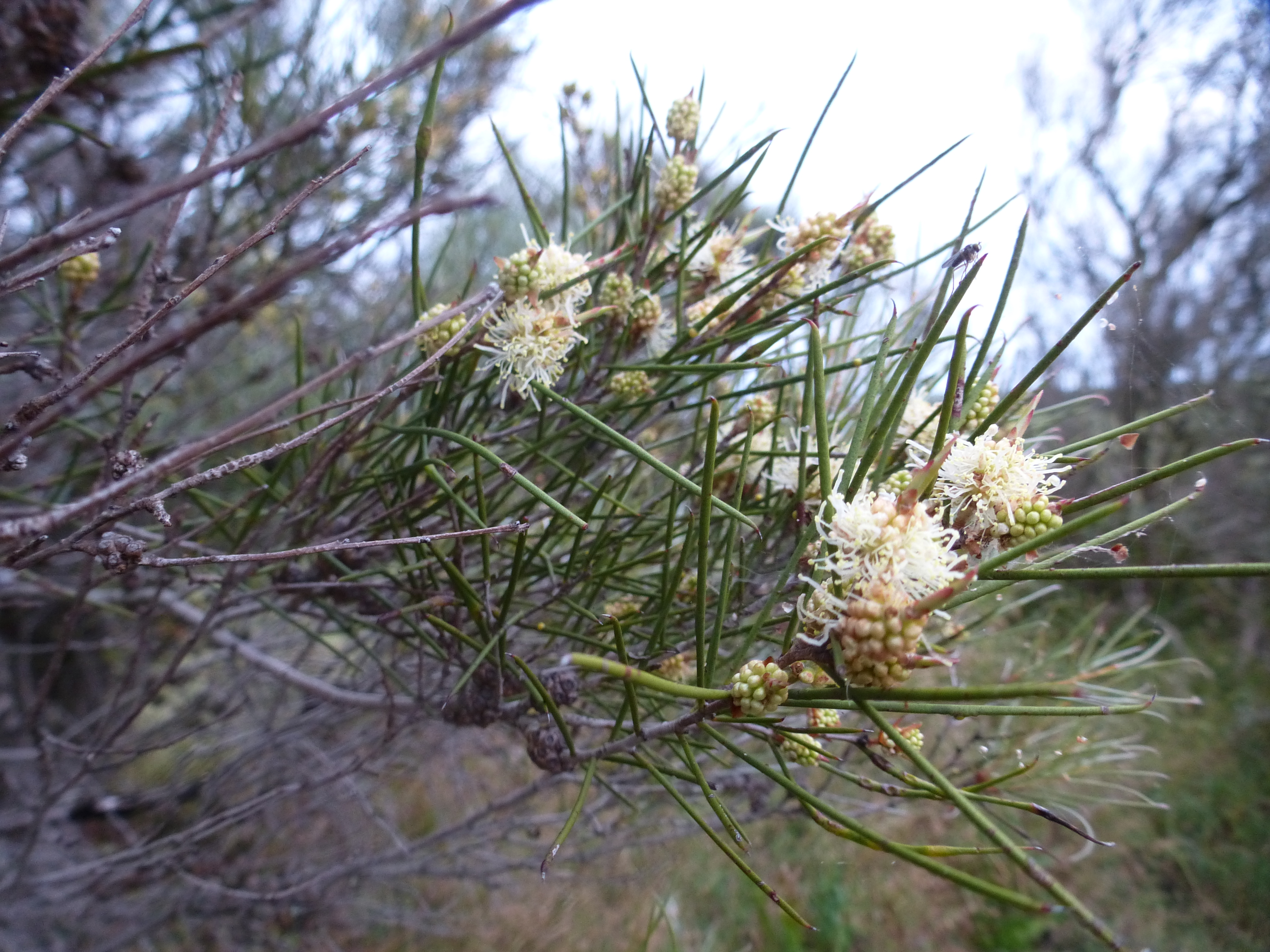

Scientific classification
- Kingdom: Plantae
- Clade: Tracheophytes
- Clade: Angiosperms
- Clade: Eudicots
- Clade: Rosids
- Order: Myrtales
- Family: Myrtaceae
- Genus: Melaleuca
- Species: M. osullivanii

Binomial name
- Melaleuca osullivanii Craven & Lepschi

= Melaleuca osullivanii =

Species of plant

Melaleuca osullivanii is a plant in the myrtle family, Myrtaceae and is endemic to the south-west of Western Australia. It was first formally described in 2004 after a review of the broombush group, Melaleuca uncinata. It differs from others in the group by having leaves that are fine and circular in cross section. The closest other broombrush is Melaleuca hamata whose leaves are 0.8–1.6 mm (0.03–0.06 in) in diameter compared to 0.7–0.9 mm (0.03–0.04 in) for this species.

== Description ==
Melaleuca osullivanii is shrub growing to 3 m (10 ft) tall with flaky, papery bark. Its leaves are 28–73 mm (1–3 in) long, 0.7–0.9 mm (0.03–0.04 in) wide, linear in shape and oval to almost circular in cross section tapering to a point or with a bristle on the end.

The flowers are creamy white and are arranged in heads containing 4 to 9 groups of flowers in threes. The petals are oval to almost circular, 0.7–1.2 mm (0.03–0.05 in) long and fall off soon after the flower opens. The stamens are arranged in five bundles around the flower, each bundle with 3 to 5 stamens. Flowering occurs in November and December and is followed by fruit which are woody capsules tightly packed together so that they appear like a single oval-shaped fruit 6.5–8 mm (0.26–0.31 in) in diameter.

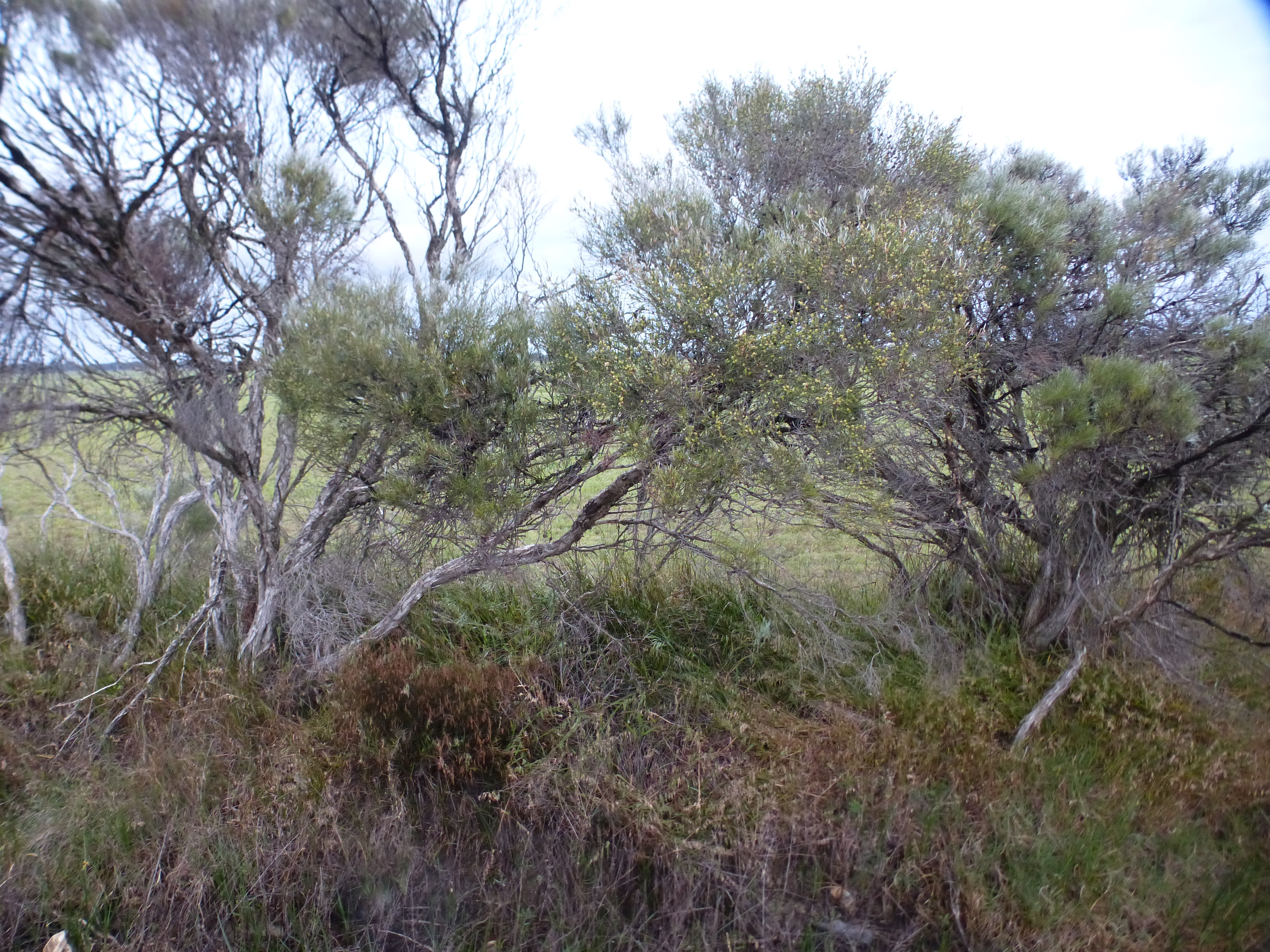
Habit at the type location near Busselton

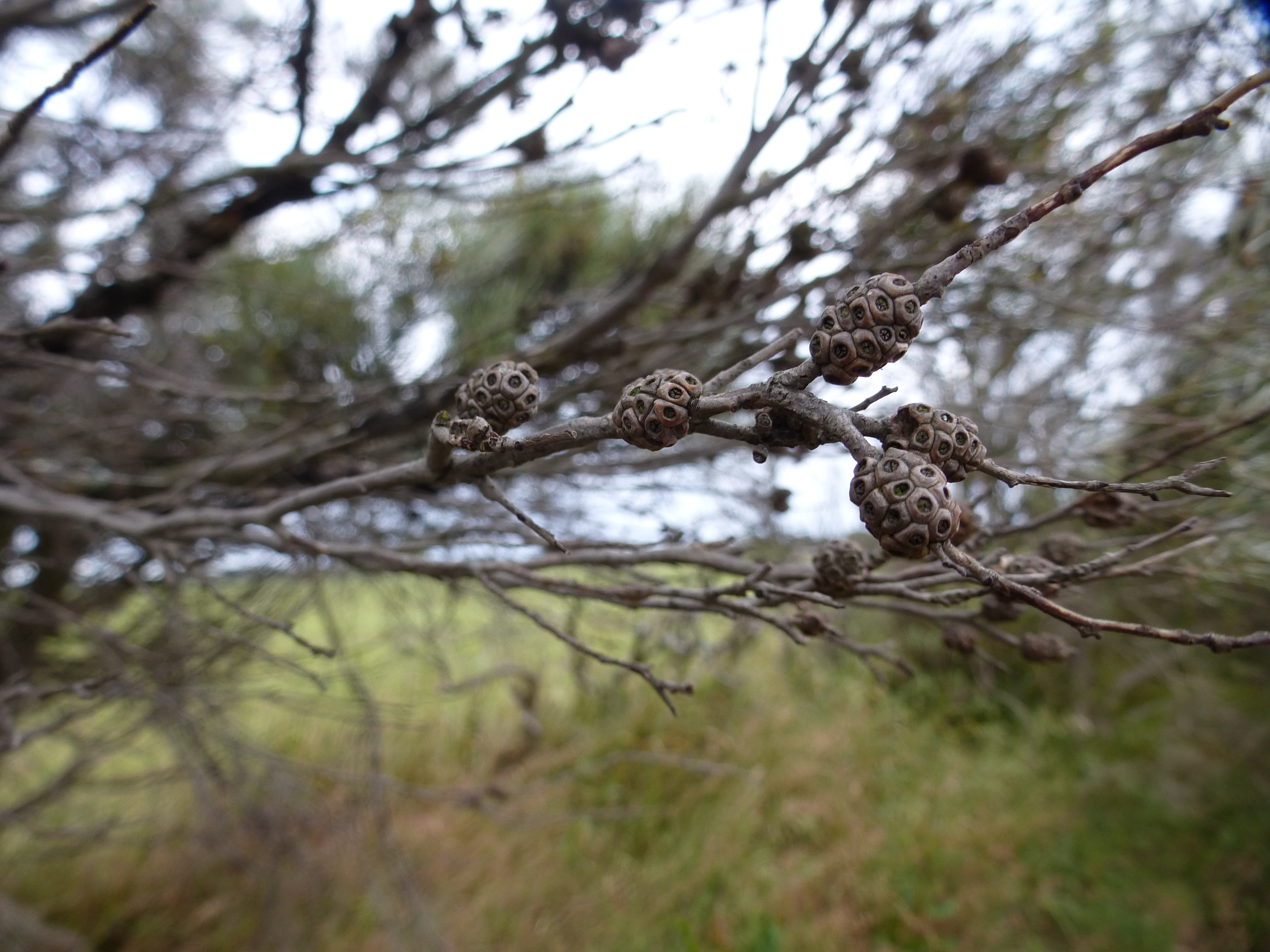
Fruit

== Taxonomy and naming ==
Melaleuca osullivanii was first formally described in 2004 by Lyndley Craven and Brendan Lepschi in Australian Systematic Botany. The specific epithet (osullivanii) is a reference to Wayne O'Sullivan who has contributed to studies of Melaleuca species in the field.

== Distribution and habitat ==
This melaleuca occurs in and between the Perth, and Busselton districts in the Jarrah Forest and Swan Coastal Plain biogeographic regions. It often grows in sand in association with other heathy species of Melaleuca, Hakea, Grevillea and introduced grasses in areas close to the coast that are wet in winter.

== Conservation ==
Melaleuca osullivanii is listed as not threatened by the Government of Western Australia Department of Parks and Wildlife.
