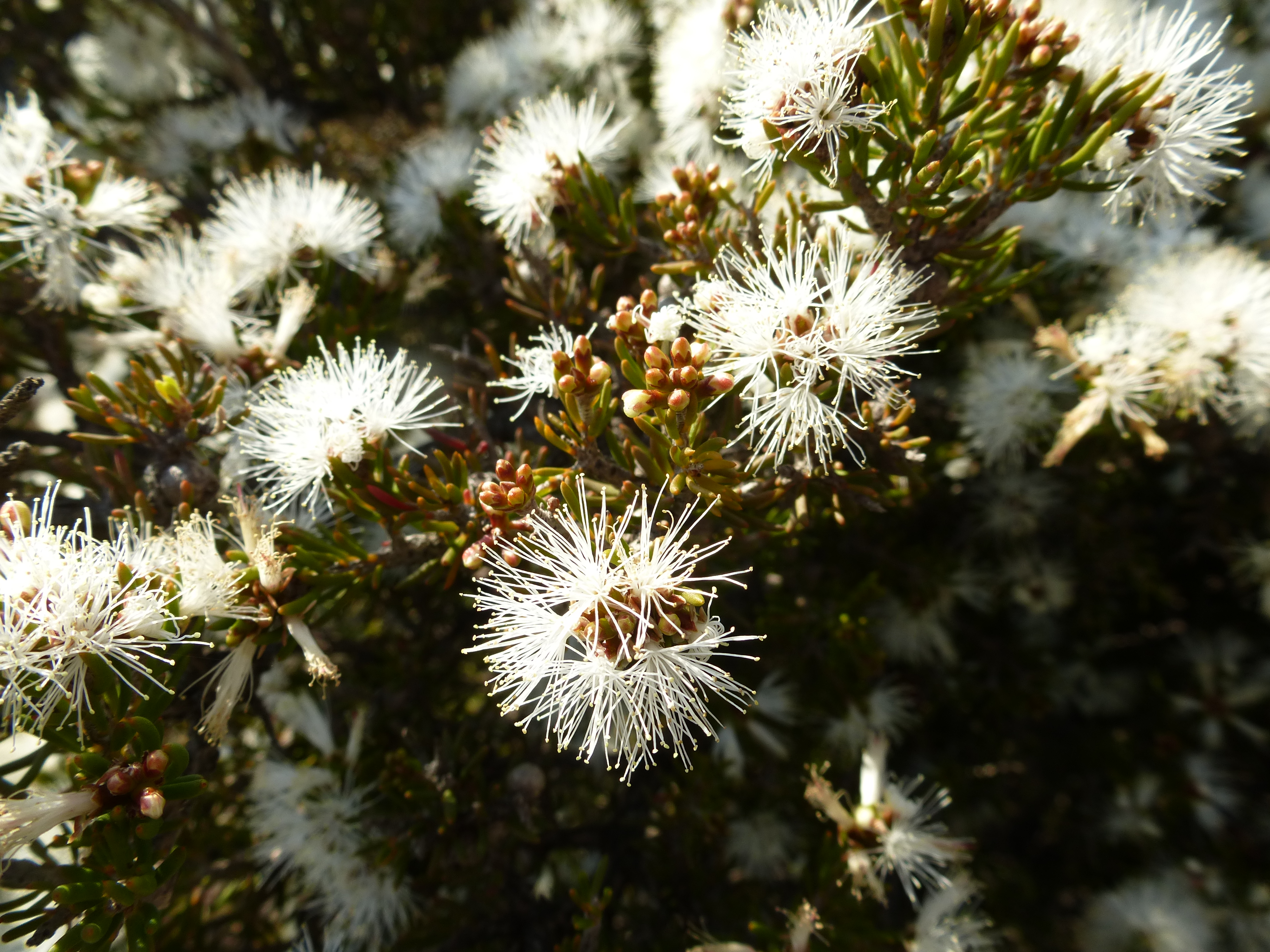

Scientific classification
- Kingdom: Plantae
- Clade: Embryophytes
- Clade: Tracheophytes
- Clade: Spermatophytes
- Clade: Angiosperms
- Clade: Eudicots
- Clade: Rosids
- Order: Myrtales
- Family: Myrtaceae
- Genus: Melaleuca
- Species: M. teuthidoides

Binomial name
- Melaleuca teuthidoides Barlow

= Melaleuca teuthidoides =

Species of shrub

Melaleuca teuthidoides is a plant in the myrtle family, Myrtaceae and is endemic to the south of Western Australia. It is a shrub with rough bark and heads of white flowers on the ends of its branches in spring and early summer.

== Description ==
Melaleuca teuthidoides is a shrub growing to about 3 m (10 ft) tall with rough, grey fissured bark. Its leaves are arranged alternately, 2.5–8 mm (0.1–0.3 in) long and 0.9–1.3 mm (0.04–0.05 in) wide, very narrow oval in shape and semicircular in cross section.

The flowers are white and arranged in heads or spikes on the ends of branches which continue to grow after flowering and sometimes in the upper leaf axils. Each head or spike contains 3 to 9 individual flowers and is up to 20 mm (0.8 in) in diameter. The stamens are arranged in five bundles around the flowers and there are 12 to 16 stamens per bundle. The main flowering period is from September to January and is followed by fruit which are woody capsules 4–5.5 mm (0.16–0.22 in) long.

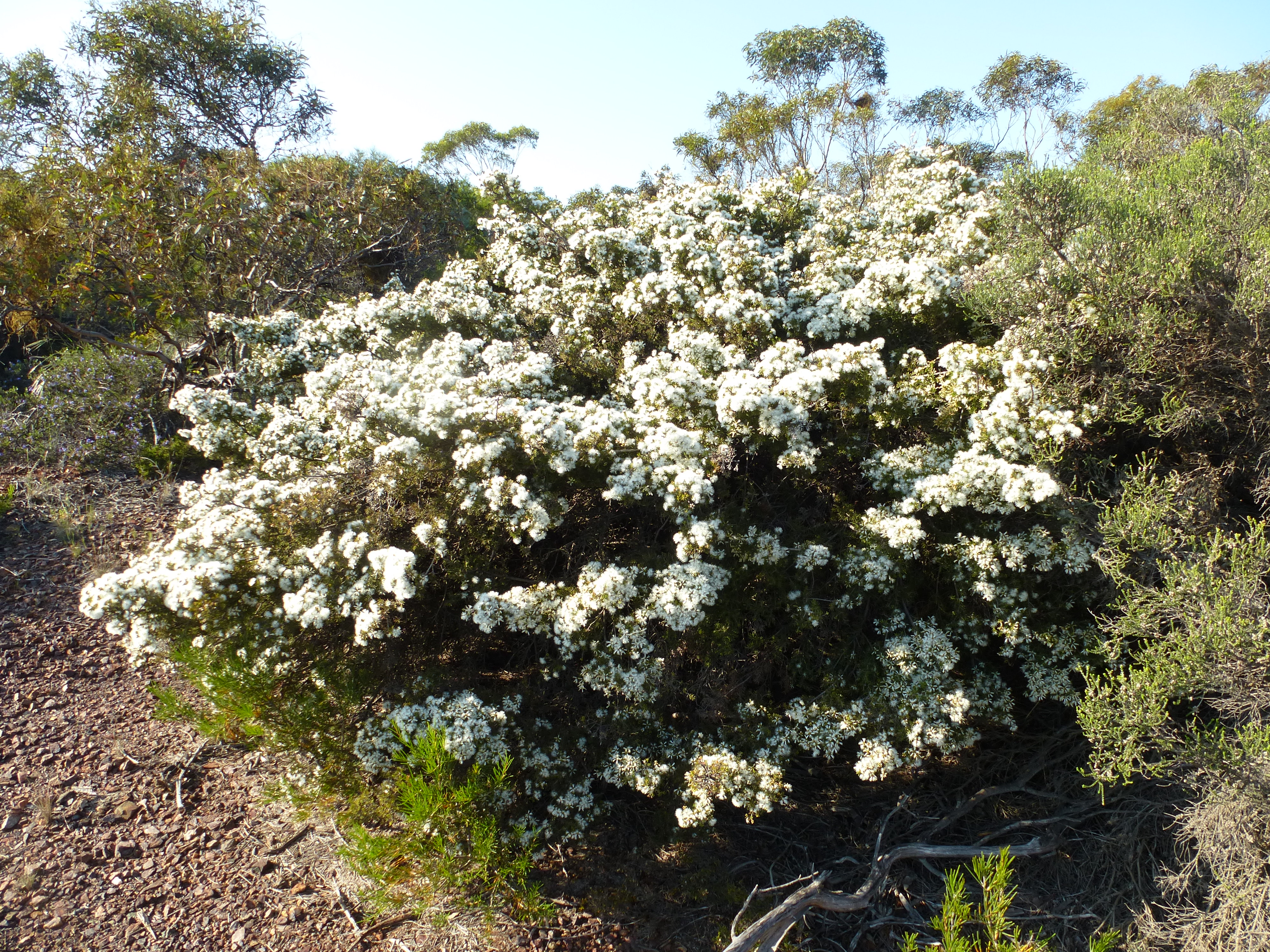
Habit 10 km (6.2 mi) east of Ravensthorpe

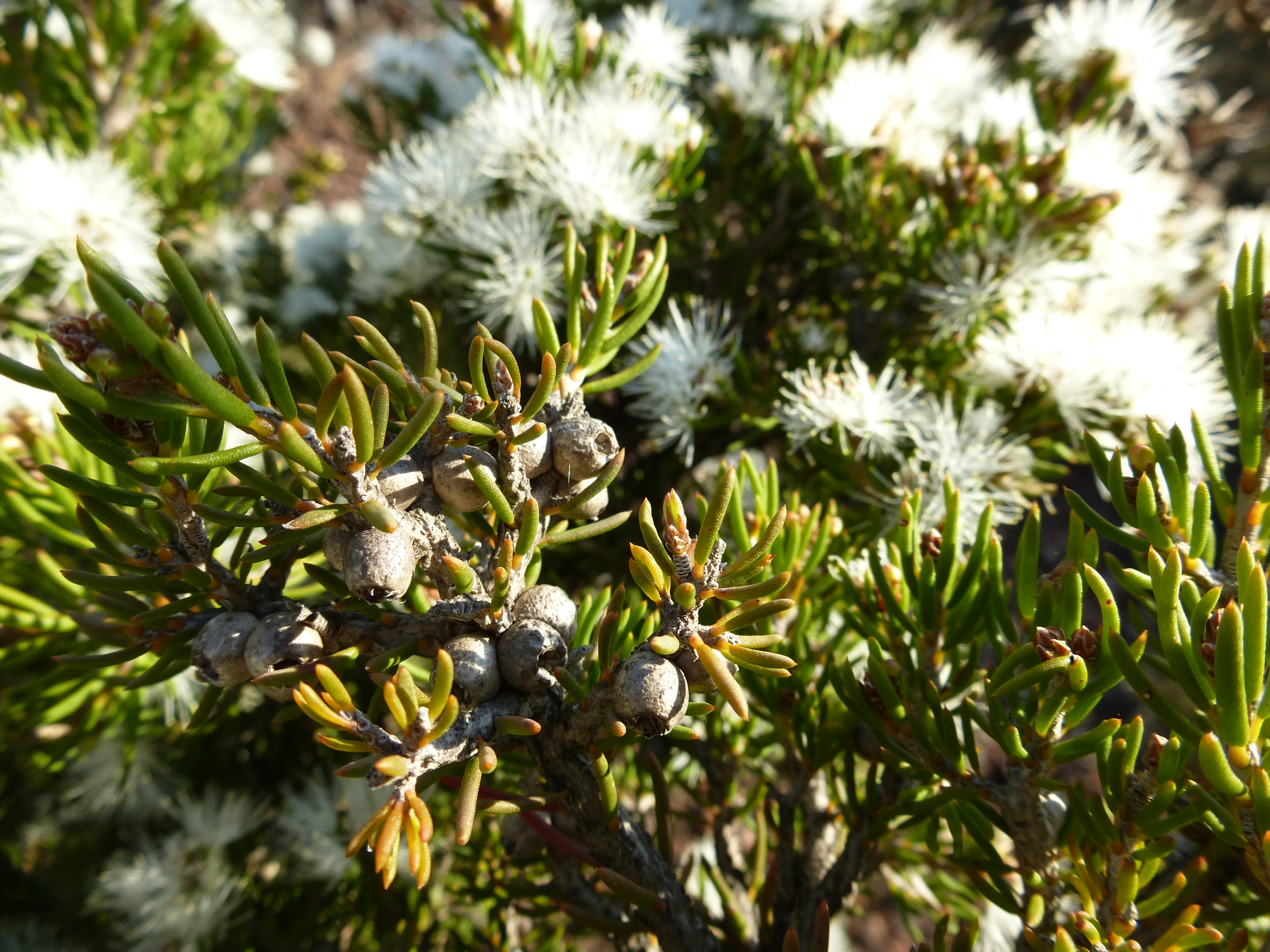
Fruit

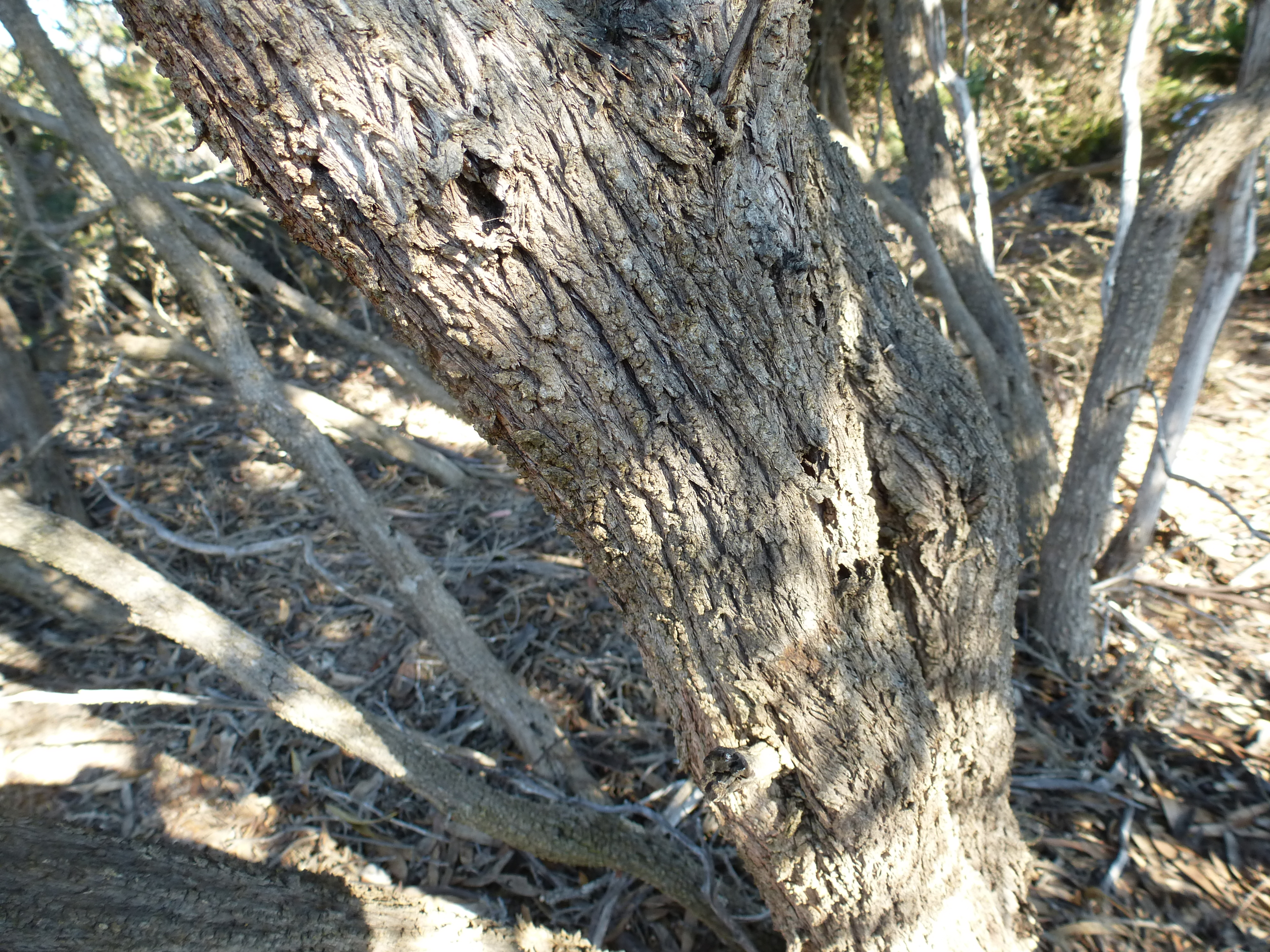
Bark

== Taxonomy and naming ==
Melaleuca teuthidoides was first formally described in 1988 by Bryan Barlow and Kirsten Cowley in Australian Systematic Botany. The specific epithet (teuthidoides) is derived from the Ancient Greek words teuthis meaning "squid" and the suffix εἶδος (eîdos) meaning "likeness" referring to the sepals' resembling the arms of a squid.

== Distribution and habitat ==
This melaleuca occurs in and between the Marvel Loch, Ravensthorpe and Balladonia districts in the Avon Wheatbelt, Coolgardie, Esperance Plains and Mallee biogeographic regions. The plants grow in sand or clay in depressions that fill with water after rain.

== Conservation ==
Melaleuca teuthidoides is listed as not threatened by the Government of Western Australia Department of Parks and Wildlife.
