= Acacia leptoneura =

Slender-nerved acacia

Conservation status
- Critically endangered (EPBC Act)

Scientific classification
- Kingdom: Plantae
- Clade: Embryophytes
- Clade: Tracheophytes
- Clade: Angiosperms
- Clade: Eudicots
- Clade: Rosids
- Order: Fabales
- Family: Fabaceae
- Subfamily: Caesalpinioideae
- Clade: Mimosoid clade
- Genus: Acacia
- Species: A. leptoneura

Binomial name
- Acacia leptoneura Benth.

Species of legume

Acacia leptoneura, also known as the slender-nerved acacia, is a species of flowering plant in the family Fabaceae and is endemic to a small area in the south-west of Western Australia. It is a domed shrub with curved or s-shaped, terete phyllodes, spherical heads of flowers and curved, firmly papery pods appearing somewhat like a string of beads.

== Description ==
Acacia leptoneura is a domed shrub that typically grow to a height of 50–80 cm (20–31 in) and has terete branchlets covered with short, stiff hairs pressed against the surface. Its phyllodes are curved or s-shaped, 30–75 mm (1.2–3.0 in) long and about 1 mm (0.039 in) wide, more or less sharply pointed, leathery and more or less glabrous. The phyllodes are striated by 16, slightly raised veins and a gland 2–4 mm (0.079–0.157 in) above a smooth, flared pulvinus. The flowers are arranged in one or two spherical heads in axils on peduncles 4–6 mm (0.16–0.24 in) long, each head about 5 mm (0.20 in) in diameter with 20 to 30 flowers. The pods are up to 30 mm (1.2 in) long and 2 mm (0.079 in) wide, firmly papery and curved and the seeds are broadly elliptic, about 2 mm (0.079 in) long and light grey, mottled dark brown with a well-developed aril.

This species is very similar to Acacia subflexuosa, apart from its phyllodes having sixteen veins rather than the eight of A. subflexuosa.

== Taxonomy ==
Acacia leptoneura was first formally described in 1842 by George Bentham in Hooker's London Journal of Botany from specimens collected in the Swan River Colony by James Drummond. The specific epithet (leptoneura) means 'thin or slender nerved'.

== Distribution and habitat ==
Slender-nerved acacia has an extremely limited distribution and is confined to a roadsides to north east of Dowerin. There are two main populations: The first is found on a low rise on growing in a sandy loamy soils over laterite, in a mostly cleared area of shrubland where it is associated with Hakea scoparia and Santalum acuminatum. The second population is growing in a sandy-loamy soil atop a low ridge composed of laterite in open mallee shrubland containing Allocasuarina acutivalvis, A. campestris and Melaleuca coronicarpa.

== Conservation status ==
Acacia leptoneura is listed as 'Critically Endangered' under the Australian Government Environment Protection and Biodiversity Conservation Act 1999 and as 'Threatened Flora (Declared Rare Flora — Extant)' by the Western Australian Government Department of Biodiversity, Conservation and Attractions.

== See also ==
- List of Acacia species
