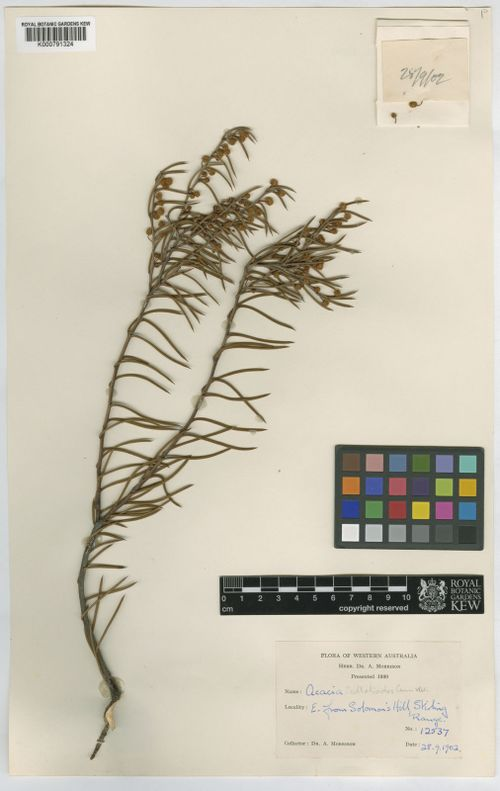
- Holotype

Scientific classification
- Kingdom: Plantae
- Clade: Tracheophytes
- Clade: Angiosperms
- Clade: Eudicots
- Clade: Rosids
- Order: Fabales
- Family: Fabaceae
- Subfamily: Caesalpinioideae
- Clade: Mimosoid clade
- Genus: Acacia
- Species: A. acellerata

Binomial name
- Acacia acellerata Maiden & Blakely

Synonyms
- ? Acacia leptoneura var. pungens Meisn.; Racosperma acelleratum (Maiden & Blakely) Pedley

= Acacia acellerata =

Species of legume

Acacia acellerata is a species of flowering plant in the family Fabaceae and is endemic to the south-west of Western Australia. It is a rigid, mostly glabrous shrub with phyllodes that are more or less round on cross-section, heads of golden-yellow flowers, and linear, wavy pods.

== Description ==
Acacia acellerata is a rigid, spreading, domed shrub that typically grows to a height of 15–70 cm (5.9–27.6 in) and is more or less glabrous. Its phyllodes are sessile, more or less round in cross-section, flat or with the edges turned under, 25–50 mm (0.98–1.97 in) long and 0.5–1.7 mm (0.020–0.067 in) long with a rigid, sharply pointed end. The flowers are borne in one or two globe-shaped heads on a peduncle 3–7 mm (0.12–0.28 in) long, the heads 3–4 mm (0.12–0.16 in) long with 12 to 20 golden-yellow flowers with spoon-shaped bracts at the base. Flowering occurs in September and October and the pods are linear and wavy, up to 50 mm (2.0 in) long and 2.0–2.5 mm (0.079–0.098 in) long, containing dark, blackish-brown, egg-shaped seeds 2.5–3.0 mm (0.098–0.118 in) long with a creamy-white, helmet-shaped aril.

== Taxonomy ==
Acacia acellerata was first formally described in 1927 by the Joseph Maiden and William Blakely in 1927 in the Journal of the Royal Society of Western Australia from specimens collected in the Stirling Range by Alexander Morrison. The specific epithet (acellerata) means "sharp" or "pungent", referring to the sharply-pointed phyllodes.

== Distribution ==
The species grows on undulating plains and along water courses as a part of shrubland communities in loam or loamy sand soils. It has a broken distribution and is found in an area between Cranbrook and east of the Stirling Range between Jerramungup and Ravensthorpe. The species is sometimes associated with Acacia curvata or A. leptoneura.

== See also ==
- List of Acacia species
