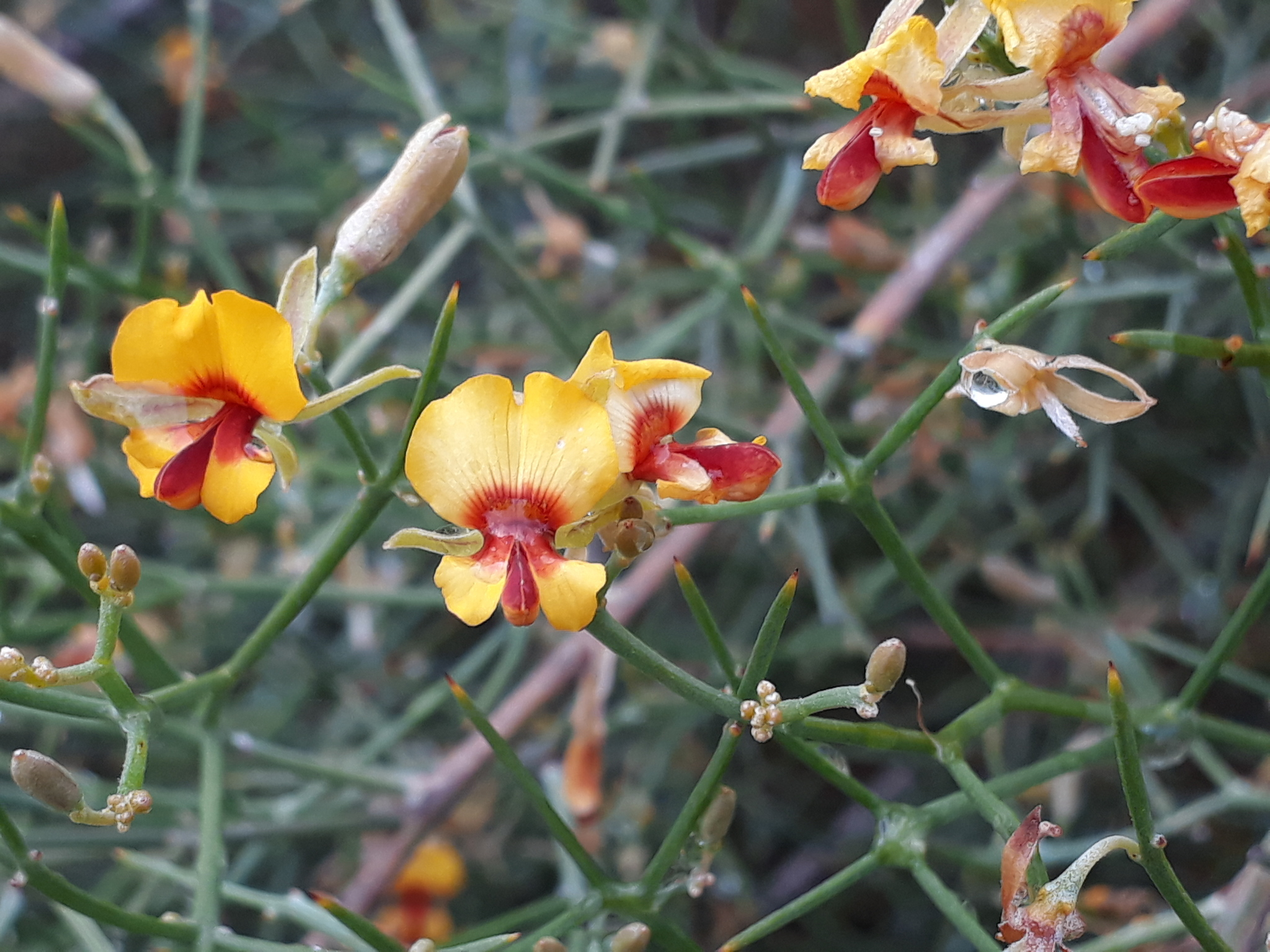

Scientific classification
- Kingdom: Plantae
- Clade: Tracheophytes
- Clade: Angiosperms
- Clade: Eudicots
- Clade: Rosids
- Order: Fabales
- Family: Fabaceae
- Subfamily: Faboideae
- Genus: Jacksonia
- Species: J. spinosa

Binomial name
- Jacksonia spinosa (Labill.) R.Br.

Synonyms
- Gompholobium spinosum Labill.; Jacksonia horrida var. tenuis Benth.; Jacksonia spinosa (Labill.) R.Br. isonym; Piptomeris spinosa (Labill.) Greene

= Jacksonia spinosa =

Species of legume

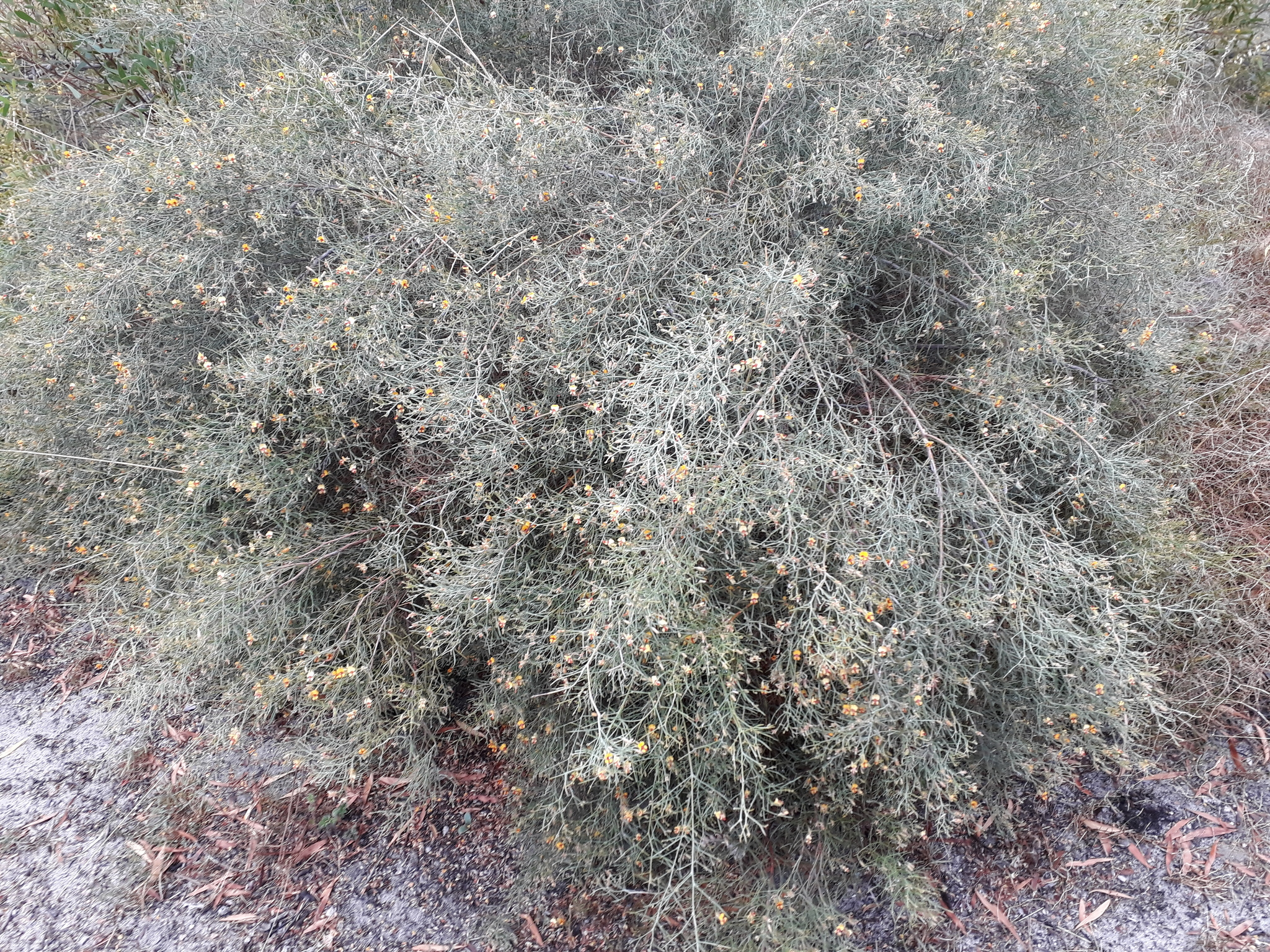
Habit near Lake Windabout

Jacksonia spinosa is a species of flowering plant in the family Fabaceae and is endemic to the south of Western Australia. It is an erect, spindly, compact or spreading shrub with dull green branches with about twenty very sharply pointed end branches 0.5–1.3 mm (0.020–0.051 in) long, leaves reduced to dark brown, broadly egg-shaped scales, yellow-orange flowers with red markings, and woody, densely hairy pods.

== Description ==
Jacksonia spinosa is an erect, spindly, compact or spreading shrub that typically grows up to 0.3–2.5 m (1 ft 0 in – 8 ft 2 in) high and 0.6–1.7 m (2 ft 0 in – 5 ft 7 in) wide. It has dull green branches, the end branches short, straight, very sharply-pointed up to 20 on each branch, 0.5–1.3 mm (0.020–0.051 in) long. Its leaves are reduced to dark brown, broadly egg-shaped scales 0.5–1.7 mm (0.020–0.067 in) long and 0.4–1.7 mm (0.016–0.067 in) wide. The flowers are scattered along the branches on pedicels 3.5–4.3 mm (0.14–0.17 in) long, with broadly egg-shaped bracteoles 0.6–1.1 mm (0.024–0.043 in) long and 0.5–0.8 mm (0.020–0.031 in) wide on the upper part of the pedicels. The floral tube is 10.6–1.2 mm (0.417–0.047 in) long and the sepals are membranous, with lobes 4.7–6.7 mm (0.19–0.26 in) long and 0.8–1.1 mm (0.031–0.043 in) wide. The standard petal is yellow-orange with red markings, 5.8–6.2 mm (0.23–0.24 in) long and 6.8–9.0 mm (0.27–0.35 in) deep, the wings are yellow orange with red markings, 5.3–5.5 mm (0.21–0.22 in) long, and the keel is yellow-orange with red markings, 4.9–5.2 mm (0.19–0.20 in) long. The stamens have pink filaments and 3.5–6.3 mm (0.14–0.25 in) long. Flowering occurs throughout the year, and the fruit is a woody, densely hairy pod 7–9 mm (0.28–0.35 in) long and 3.0–3.5 mm (0.12–0.14 in) wide.

== Taxonomy ==
This species was first formally described in 1805 by Jacques Labillardière who gave it the name Gompholobium spinosum in his Novae Hollandiae Plantarum Specimen. In 1811, Robert Brown transferred the species to Jacksonia as J. spinosa in Abraham Rees's Rees's Cyclopædia. The specific epithet (spinosa) means 'spiny'.

== Distribution and habitat ==
This species of Jacksonia grows in coastal shrubland or woodland on sand over granite, limestone or laterite, from north-east of Walpole to Cape Arid National Park and inland as far as the Porongupup and Stirling Range National Parks, in the Avon Wheatbelt, Esperance Plains, Jarrah Forest, Mallee,Swan Coastal Plain and Warren bioregions of southern Western Australia.

== Conservation status ==
Jacksonia spinosa is listed as "not threatened" by the Government of Western Australia Department of Biodiversity, Conservation and Attractions.
