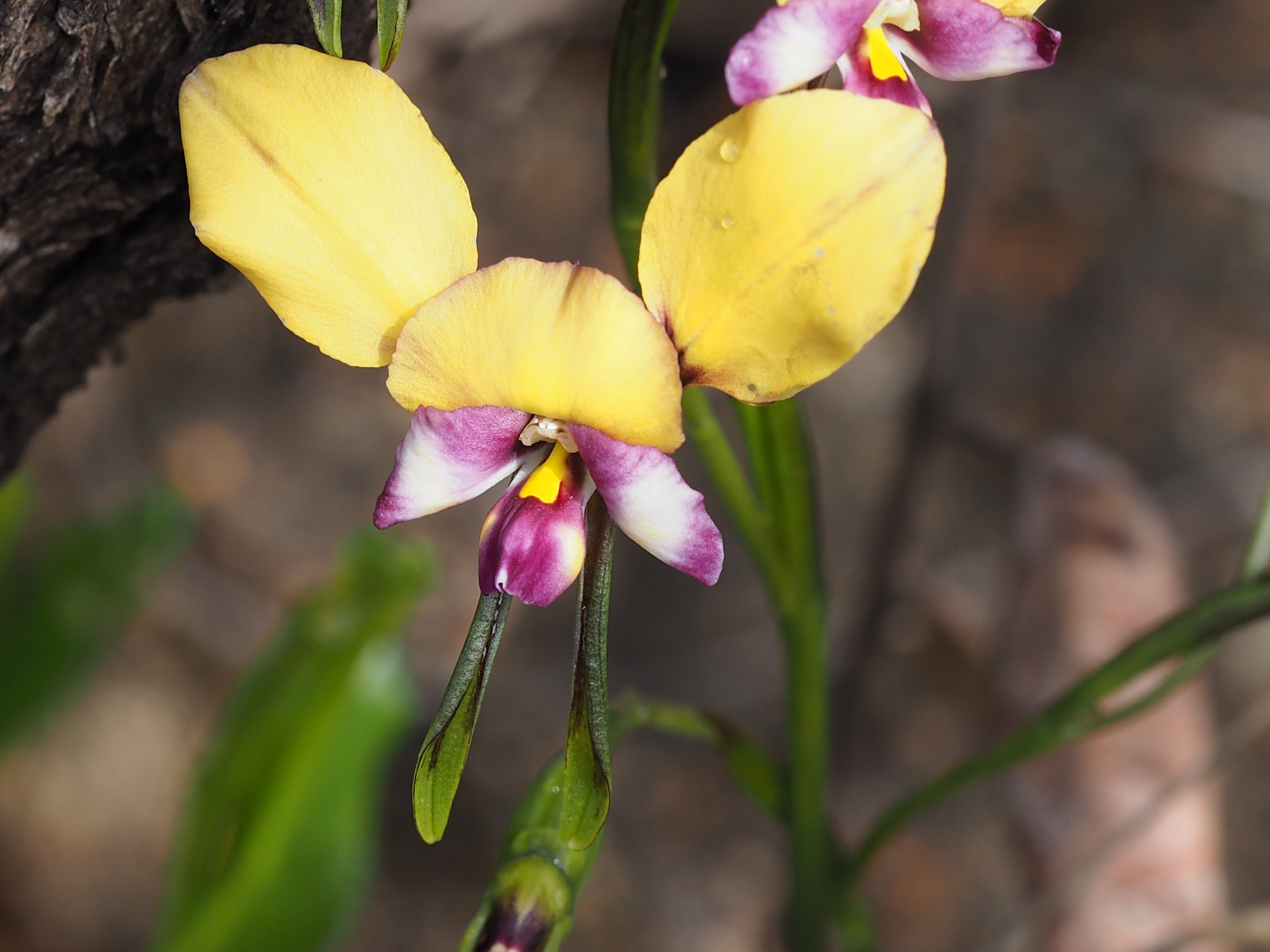
- In the Mount Burdett Nature Reserve

Scientific classification
- Kingdom: Plantae
- Clade: Embryophytes
- Clade: Tracheophytes
- Clade: Angiosperms
- Clade: Monocots
- Order: Asparagales
- Family: Orchidaceae
- Subfamily: Orchidoideae
- Tribe: Diurideae
- Genus: Diuris
- Species: D. pulchella

Binomial name
- Diuris pulchella D.L.Jones

= Diuris pulchella =

Beautiful donkey orchid

Species of orchid

Diuris pulchella, commonly called beautiful donkey orchid is a species of orchid that is endemic to the south-eastern part of the south-west of Western Australia. It has two or three leaves at its base and up to five bright yellow and mauve flowers described as "exquisite", "spectacular" and "attractive". It grows in shallow soil on granite outcrops near Esperance.

== Description ==
Diuris pulchella is a tuberous, perennial herb with two or three linear to lance-shaped leaves, each leaf 100–200 mm (4–8 in) long, 6–10 mm (0.2–0.4 in) wide and folded lengthwise. Up to five bright yellow flowers with mauve, green and white markings, 20–40 mm (0.8–2 in) long and 20–30 mm (0.8–1 in) wide are borne on a flowering stem 300–500 mm (10–20 in) tall. The dorsal sepal projects forwards near its base then curves upwards and is egg-shaped to kidney-shaped, 9–14 mm (0.4–0.6 in) long and 10–13 mm (0.4–0.5 in) wide. The lateral sepals are linear to lance-shaped, green with purplish markings, 15–22 mm (0.6–0.9 in) long, about 3 mm (0.1 in) wide and turned downwards. The petals are more or less erect with an egg-shaped blade 15–18 mm (0.6–0.7 in) long and 9–11 mm (0.35–0.43 in) wide on a greenish mauve stalk 5–7 mm (0.2–0.3 in) long. The labellum is 9–10 mm (0.35–0.39 in) long and has three lobes. The centre lobe is wedge-shaped to more or less round or kidney-shaped, 7–10 mm (0.3–0.4 in) wide and the side lobes are 8–10 mm (0.3–0.4 in) long and 3–4 mm (0.1–0.2 in) wide. There is a single yellow, ridge-like callus occupying about one-third of the length of the labellum near its base. Flowering occurs in August and September.

== Taxonomy and naming ==
Diuris pulchella was first formally described in 1991 by David Jones from a specimen collected in the Mount Ney Nature Reserve, and the description was published in Australian Orchid Review. The specific epithet (pulchella) is the diminutive form of the Latin word pulcher meaning "beautiful" hence "beautiful little", referring to the "highly colourful and attractive flowers". Other authors have described the flowers as "exquisite" or "spectacular".

== Distribution and habitat ==
Beautiful donkey orchid grows usually in shallow soil on and around granite outcrops and is found between Salmon Gums, Esperance and Balladonia in the Coolgardie, Esperance Plains and Mallee biogeographic regions.

== Conservation ==
Diuris pulchella is classified as "not threatened" by the Western Australian Government Department of Environment and Conservation (Western Australia).
