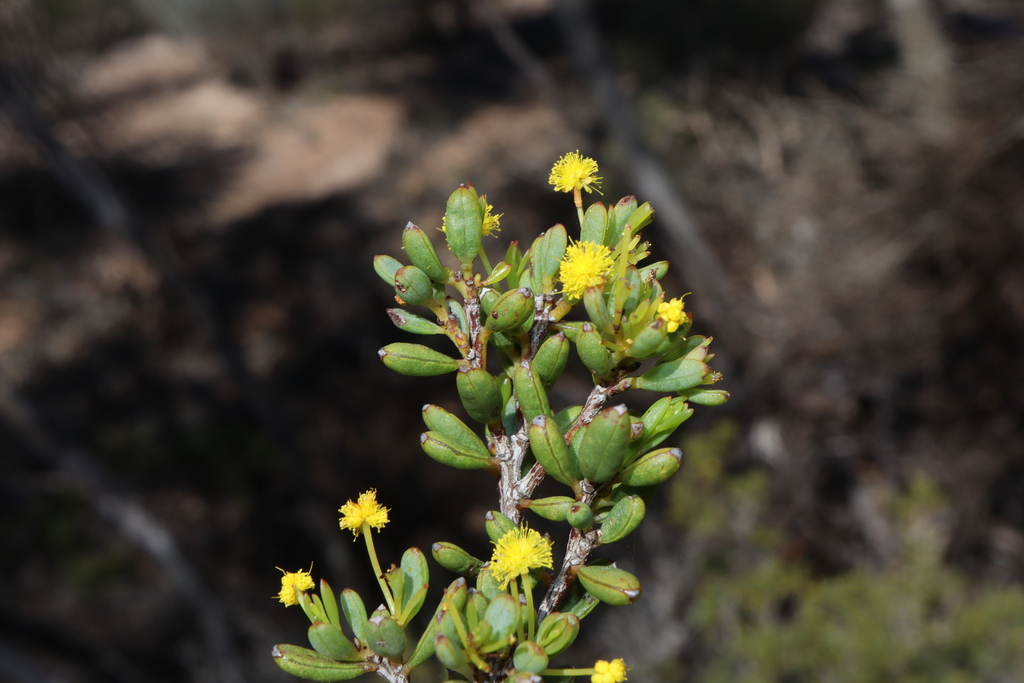

Scientific classification
- Kingdom: Plantae
- Clade: Tracheophytes
- Clade: Angiosperms
- Clade: Eudicots
- Clade: Rosids
- Order: Fabales
- Family: Fabaceae
- Subfamily: Caesalpinioideae
- Clade: Mimosoid clade
- Genus: Acacia
- Species: A. crassuloides

Binomial name
- Acacia crassuloides Maslin
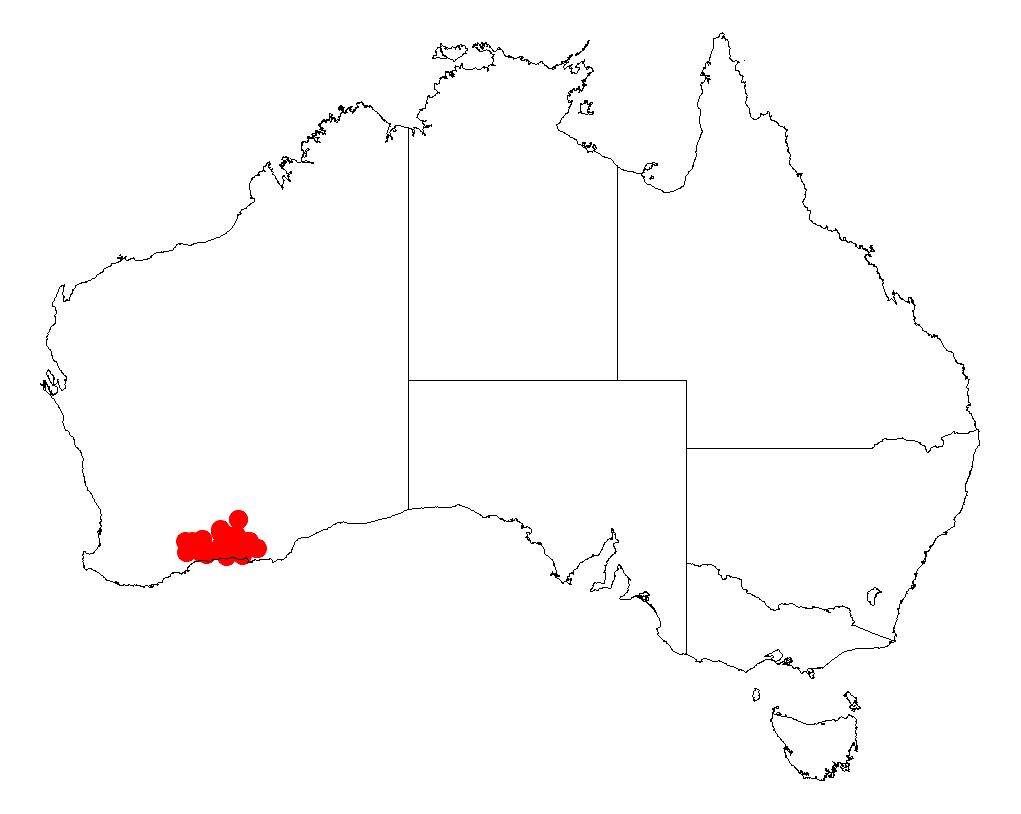
- Occurrence data from AVH

Synonyms
- Racosperma crassuloides (Maslin) Pedley

= Acacia crassuloides =

Species of legume

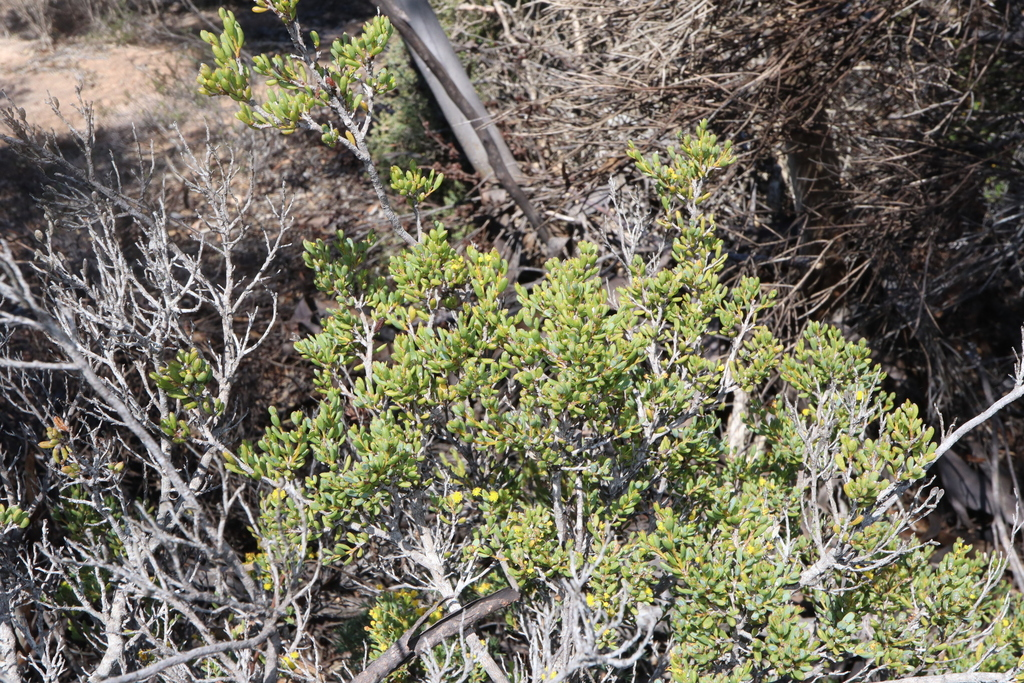
Habitat in Frank Hann National Park

Acacia crassuloides is a species of flowering plant in the family Fabaceae and is endemic to the south-west of Western Australia. It is a glabrous, dense, cushion-like spreading shrub with many stems, ascending, thick and fleshy, egg-shaped to oblong phyllodes, spherical heads of golden yellow flowers and crust-like, oblong, S-shaped to curved pods.

== Description ==
Acacia crassuloides is a glabrous, dense, cushion-like, spreading shrub that typically grows to a height of 15–50 cm (5.9–19.7 in) and often forms prostrate mats. Its phyllodes are ascending, thick and fleshy, egg-shaped with the narrower end towards the base to oblong, 4–10 mm (0.16–0.39 in) long, 1.3–3 mm (0.051–0.118 in) wide and flattened to convex with one vein on the lower surface. The flowers are borne in two spherical heads in racemes on peduncles 2–8 mm (0.079–0.315 in) long. The heads are about 3 mm (0.12 in) in diameter with 7 to 10 golden yellow flowers. Flowering occurs from about September and October, and the pods are oblong, up to 15 mm (0.59 in) long, 3–4 mm (0.12–0.16 in) wide and S-shaped to curved, sometimes in a complete circle. The seeds are pear-shaped, 2.0–2.5 mm (0.079–0.098 in) long, shiny, light grey with a club-shaped aril more than half the length of the seed.

== Taxonomy ==
Acacia crassuloides was first formally described in 1978 by Bruce Maslin in the journal Nuytsia from specimens collected by James Hamlyn Willis 110 km (68 mi) south of Norseman in 1963. The specific epithet (crassuloides), suggested by Willis, means 'Crassula-like', referring to the thick phyllodes, that are reminiscent of the leaves in some species of Crassula.

== Distribution and habitat ==
This species of wattle grows in a variety of soils in open heath, shrubland and mallee woodland from Lake King to Salmon Gums and Mount Ney in the Coolgardie, Esperance Plains and Mallee bioregions of south-western Western Australia.

== Conservation status ==
Acacia crassuloides is listed as "not threatened" by the Government of Western Australia Department of Biodiversity, Conservation and Attractions.

== See also ==
- List of Acacia species
