= Bandy Creek, Western Australia =

Locality in the Shire of Esperance, Western Australia

Bandy Creek
- Suburb
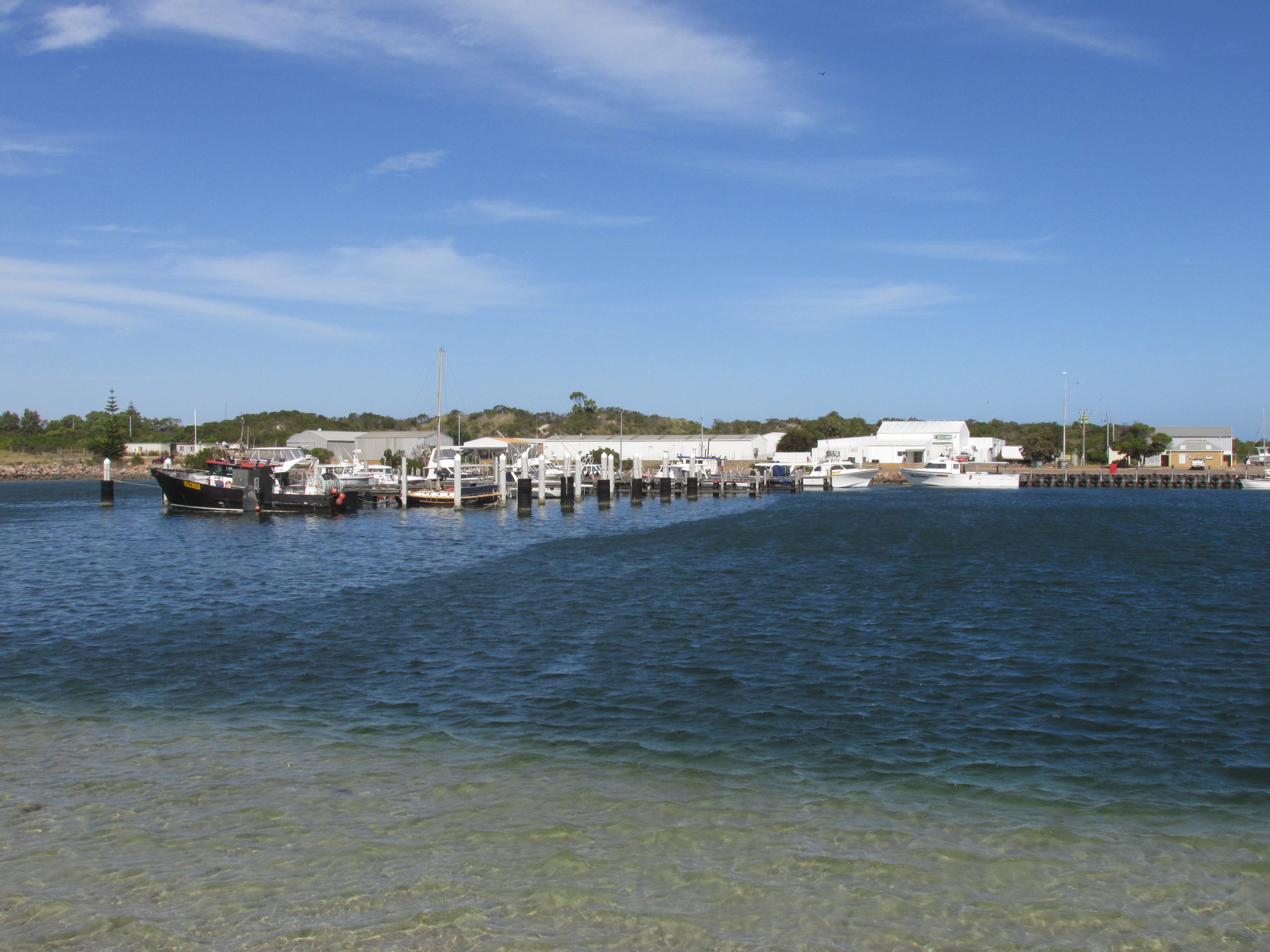
- Bandy Creek boat harbour

- Interactive map of Bandy Creek
- Coordinates: 33°49′19″S 121°55′59″E
- Country: Australia
- State: Western Australia
- City: Esperance
- LGA: Shire of Esperance
- Location: 6 km (3.7 mi) NE of Esperance

Government
  - State electorate: Roe
  - Federal division: O'Connor

Area
  - Total: 34.3 km^{2} (13.2 sq mi)

Population
  - Total: 383 (SAL 2021)
- Postcode: 6450
Suburbs around Bandy Creek
Windabout	Myrup	Myrup
Windabout	Bandy Creek	Merivale
Castletown	Southern Ocean	Southern Ocean

Bandy Creek is a north-eastern suburb of Esperance, a town in south-eastern Western Australia. Its local government area is the Shire of Esperance, and it is located 6 kilometres (4 mi) northeast of Esperance's central business district. The east and north of Bandy Creek are covered by the Mullet Lake Nature Reserve while, in the south, it borders the Southern Ocean.

In the 2006 census, Bandy Creek had a population of 223.

The Mullet Lake Nature Reserve was gazetted on 2 October 1953, has a size of 18.85 square kilometres (7.28 mi^{2}) and is located within the Esperance Plains bioregion.
