= Myrup, Western Australia =

Locality in the Shire of Esperance, Western Australia

Myrup
- other
- Coordinates: 33.78997°S 121.92440°E
- Country: Australia
- State: Western Australia
- LGA: Shire of Esperance
- Location: 602 km (374 mi) SE of Perth; 178 km (111 mi) S of Norseman; 9 km (5.6 mi) NE of Esperance

Government
  - State electorate: Roe
  - Federal division: O'Connor

Area
  - Total: 147.1 km^{2} (56.8 sq mi)

Population
  - Total: 518 (SAL 2021)
- Postcode: 6450
Localities around Myrup
Gibson	Gibson	Neridup
Monjingup	Myrup	Merivale
Windabout	Bandy Creek	Merivale

Myrup is a locality of the Shire of Esperance in the Goldfields-Esperance region of Western Australia. The Coolgardie–Esperance Highway forms its western border. The eastern part of the townsite of Shark Lake is located in the west of Myrup, while the Woody Lake Nature Reserve is located in the south-west.

Myrup is on the traditional land of the Njunga people of the Noongar nation. The Njunga were previously part of the Wudjari Noongar, but separated from them for cultural reasons.

The Kalgoorlie to Esperance railway passes through the north-west of the locality. The former railway siding of Caitup was located on this section of railway line, operating from 1925 to 1960.
