= Acacia curvata =

Scientific classification
- Kingdom: Plantae
- Clade: Tracheophytes
- Clade: Angiosperms
- Clade: Eudicots
- Clade: Rosids
- Order: Fabales
- Family: Fabaceae
- Subfamily: Caesalpinioideae
- Clade: Mimosoid clade
- Genus: Acacia
- Species: A. curvata

Binomial name
- Acacia curvata Maslin
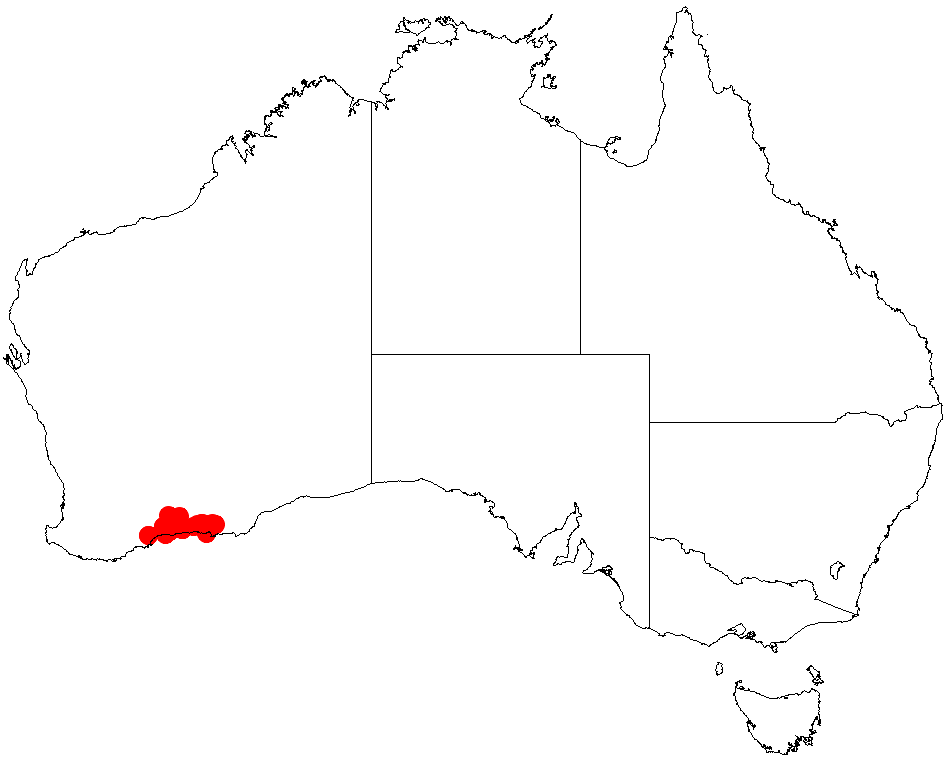
- Occurrence data from AVH

Synonyms
- Racosperma curvatum (Maslin) Pedley

Species of legume

Acacia curvata is a species of flowering plant in the family Fabaceae and is endemic to the south-west of Western Australia. It is a harsh, much-branched shrub with hairy branchlets, more or less crowded, curved, scimitar-shaped, sharply pointed phyllodes, spherical heads of golden yellow flowers and linear, strongly curved glabrous pods.

== Description ==
Acacia curvata is a harsh, much-branched, shrub that typically grows to 0.3–1.5 m (1 ft 0 in – 4 ft 11 in) high and about 3 m (9.8 ft) wide, its branchlets densely covered with fine, soft hairs. Its phyllodes are more or less crowded, more or less sessile, scimitar shaped with the end strongly curved down, 10–20 mm (0.39–0.79 in) long, 1–3 mm (0.039–0.118 in) wide, rigid, sharply pointed and glabrous with three prominent main veins. There are stipules at the base of the phyllodes, but that sometimes fall off as the phyllodes mature. The flowers are borne in a spherical head on a peduncle 5–9 mm (0.20–0.35 in) long, the head 3.0–3.5 mm (0.12–0.14 in) in diameter with 13 to 25 golden yellow flowers. Flowering occurs from May to July, and the pods are linear, curved and raised over the seeds, up to 50 mm (2.0 in) long, 4.0–4.5 mm (0.16–0.18 in) wide and firmly papery to thinly leathery and glabrous.

== Taxonomy ==
Acacia curvata was first formally described in by the botanist Bruce Maslin in 1977 in the journal Nuytsia from specimens collected 5.5 mi (8.9 km) south-east of Kundip by Kenneth Newbey in 1965. The specific epithet (curvata) refers to the characteristic recurved phyllodes.

== Distribution ==
This species of wattle grows in clay, clay loam or gravel mostly in open scrub between Ravensthorpe, south of Kundip and Munglinup and in the Scaddan-Wittenoom Hills area in the Esperance Plains and Mallee bioregions of south-western Western Australia.

== See also ==
- List of Acacia species
