= Merivale, Western Australia =

Locality in the Shire of Esperance, Western Australia

Merivale
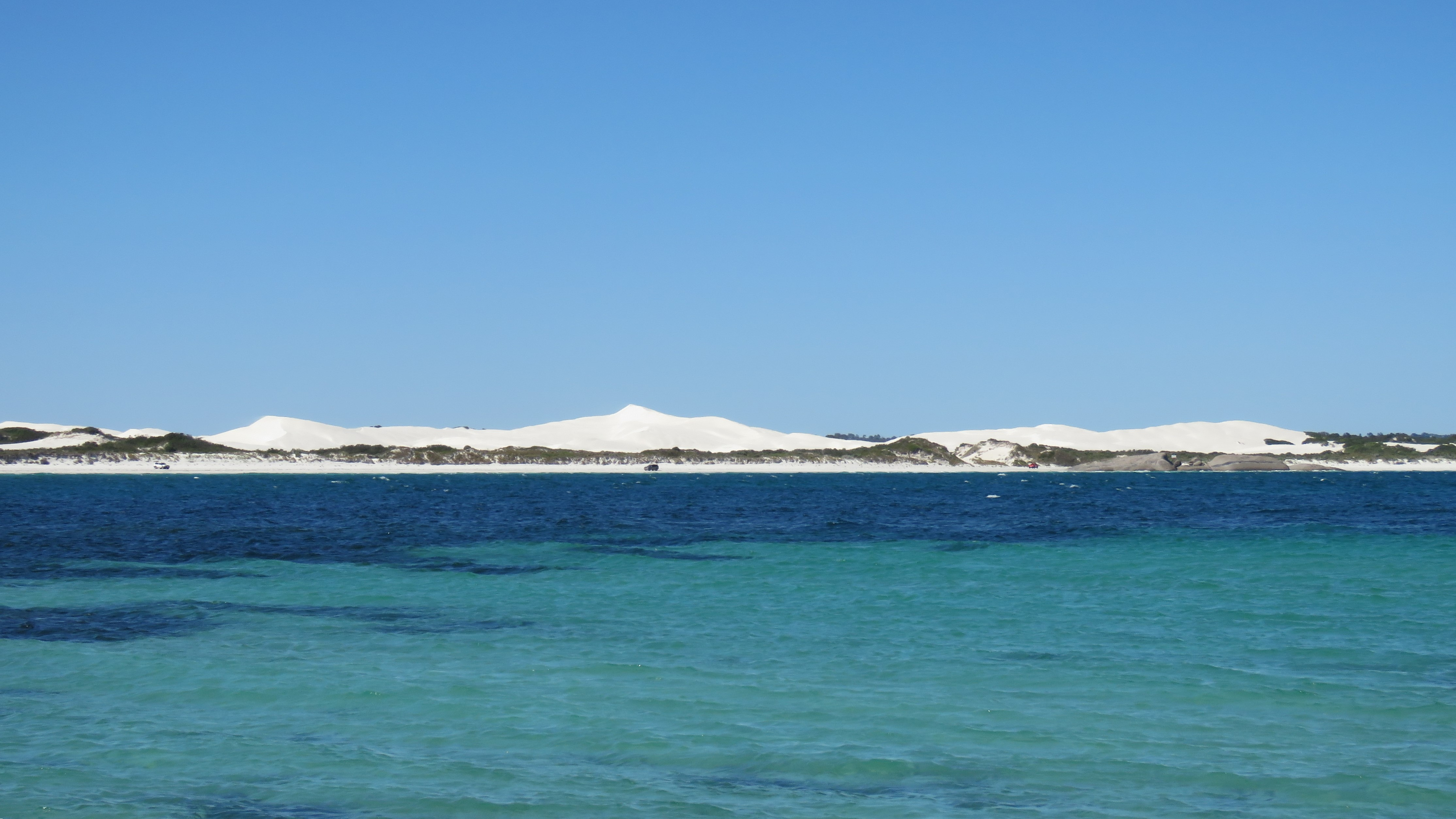
- Vehicles on Le Grand Beach, seen from Wylie Bay

- Interactive map of Merivale
- Coordinates: 33.82163°S 122.11257°E
- Country: Australia
- State: Western Australia
- LGA: Shire of Esperance
- Location: 628 km (390 mi) SE of Perth; 185 km (115 mi) S of Norseman; 30 km (19 mi) E of Esperance

Government
  - State electorate: Roe
  - Federal division: O'Connor

Area
  - Total: 444.1 km^{2} (171.5 sq mi)

Population
  - Total: 87 (SAL 2021)
- Postcode: 6450
Localities around Merivale
| Myrup | Neridup | Condingup |
| Bandy Creek | Merivale | Condingup |
| Southern Ocean | Cape Le Grand | Cape Le Grand |

Merivale is a rural locality of the Shire of Esperance in the Goldfields-Esperance region of Western Australia, located along Le Grand Beach, on the Southern Ocean. The northern boundary of Cape Le Grand National Park forms the southern border of Merivale.

Merivale is on the traditional land of the Njunga people of the Noongar nation. The Njunga were previously part of the Wudjari Noongar, but separated from them for cultural reasons.

Le Grand Beach, which runs from Wylie Bay, in Bandy Creek, via Merivale to the Cape Le Grand National Park, is used as an access road to the national park for four-wheel drive vehicles.
