= Castletown, Western Australia =

Castletown Esperance, Western Australia
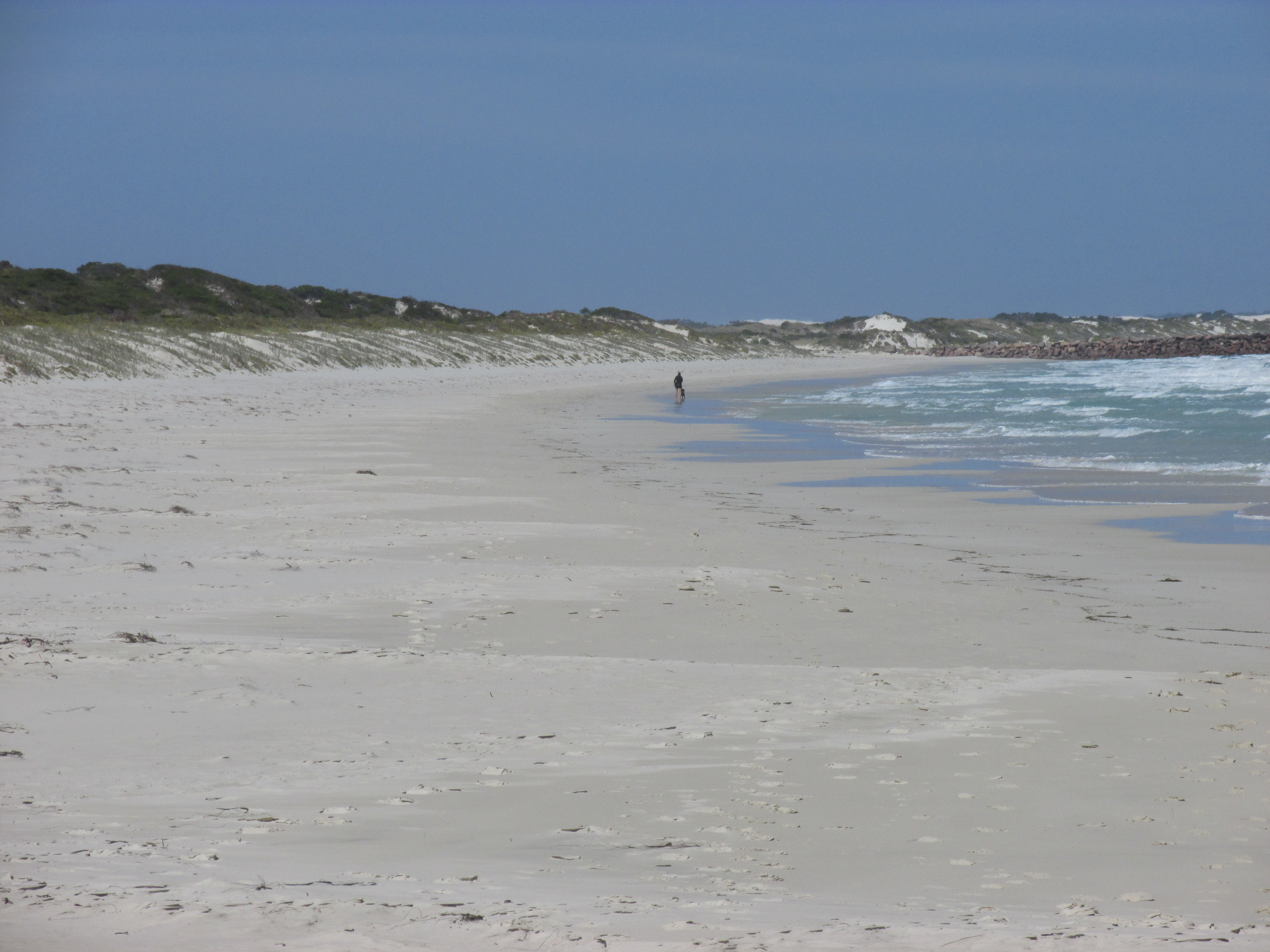
- Beach at Castletown

- Coordinates: 33°50′10″S 121°54′36″E
- Population: 3,968 (SAL 2021)
- Postcode(s): 6450
- Area: 1.6 km^{2} (0.6 sq mi)
- Location: 4 km (2 mi) NE of Esperance
- LGA(s): Shire of Esperance
- State electorate(s): Roe
- Federal division(s): O'Connor
Suburbs around Castletown:
Windabout	Windabout	Bandy Creek
Chadwick	Castletown	Bandy Creek
Chadwick	Southern Ocean	Southern Ocean

Castletown is a north-eastern suburb of Esperance, a town in south-eastern Western Australia. Its local government area is the Shire of Esperance.

The suburb was gazetted in 1965.

== Geography ==
Castletown is located 4 kilometres (2 mi) northeast of Esperance's central business district. It is bounded on the west by Norseman Road, on the north by Stable and Fisheries Roads, and on the east by Goldfields and Ormonde Roads.

== Demographics ==
In the 2006 census, Castletown had a population of 3,113.

Castletown residents had a median age of 34, and the median individual income was $480 per week compared with $454 per week in the Esperance region. The population of Castletown was predominantly Australian-born - 83.5% as at the 2006 census and at the 2006 census, 3.9% of residents identified as Indigenous Australians.
