= Acacia subflexuosa =

Scientific classification
- Kingdom: Plantae
- Clade: Tracheophytes
- Clade: Angiosperms
- Clade: Eudicots
- Clade: Rosids
- Order: Fabales
- Family: Fabaceae
- Subfamily: Caesalpinioideae
- Clade: Mimosoid clade
- Genus: Acacia
- Species: A. subflexuosa

Binomial name
- Acacia subflexuosa Maiden
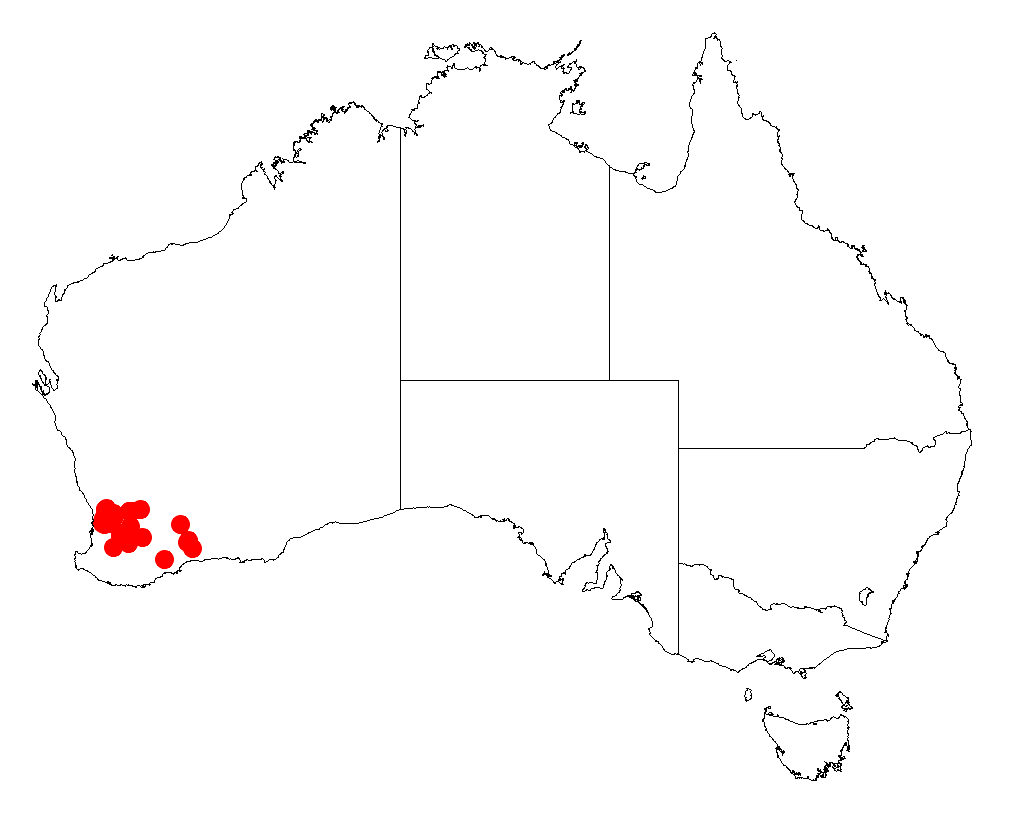
- Occurrence data from AVH

Species of legume

Acacia subflexuosa is a shrub of the genus Acacia and the subgenus Plurinerves that is endemic to an area of south western Australia.

== Description ==
The dense shrub typically grows to a height of 0.25 to 1 metre (1 to 3 ft) with a rounded habit and nerveless, hairy and cylindrical branchlets that have persistent stipules with a length of 1 to 2 mm (0.039 to 0.079 in). Like most species of Acacia it has phyllodes rather than true leaves. The widely spreading phyllodes have an irregular thread-like shape and are strongly to shallowly with a length of 3.5 to 7 cm (1.4 to 2.8 in) and a width of 1 to 2 mm (0.039 to 0.079 in) and have eight strongly raised nerves. It blooms from August to September and produces yellow flowers. The simple inflorescences occur singly or in pairs in the axils and have spherical flower-heads with a diameter of 3.5 to 4 mm (0.14 to 0.16 in) containing 15 to 22 golden coloured flowers. The firmly chartaceous seed pods that form after flowering are linear to curved and resembling a string of beads and contain dull brown seeds that are sometimes mottled with a broadly elliptic shape that are about 2.5 mm (0.098 in) in length with a crested aril.

== Taxonomy ==
There are two recognised subspecies:

- Acacia subflexuosa subsp. capillata
- Acacia subflexuosa subsp. subflexuosa

== Distribution ==
It is native to an area in the Wheatbelt regions of Western Australia where it is commonly situated on ridge, hills and undulating plains growing in sandy or clay-loam soils often over or around granite or laterite. The range of the plant extends from around Toodyay in the west to around Cunderdin in the east and as far south as the Dryandra Woodland with disjunct populations found near Lake King as a part of jarrah or wandoo or mallee woodland or scrubland communities.

== See also ==
- List of Acacia species
