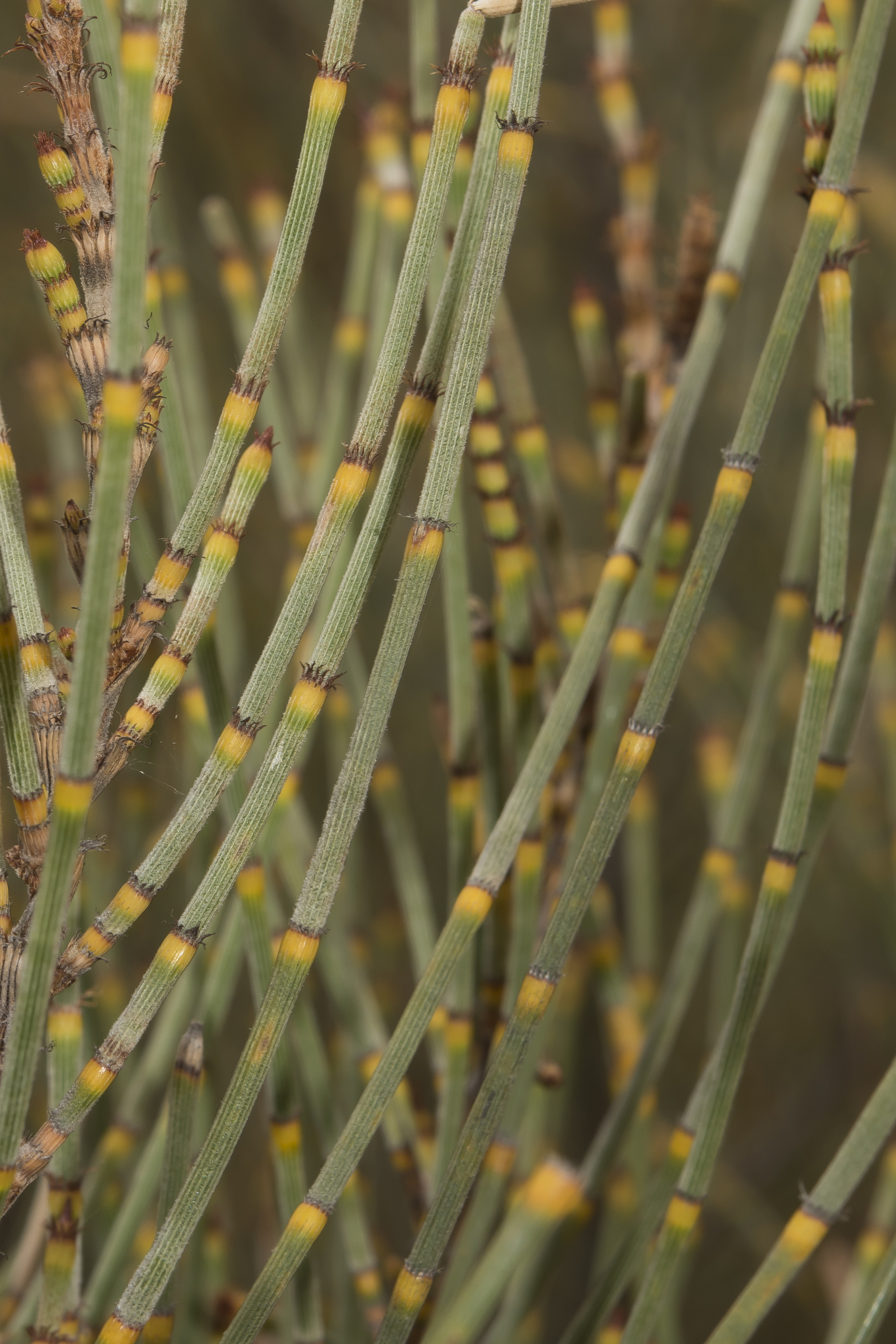
- Branchlets and scale-like leaves

Scientific classification
- Kingdom: Plantae
- Clade: Tracheophytes
- Clade: Angiosperms
- Clade: Eudicots
- Clade: Rosids
- Order: Fagales
- Family: Casuarinaceae
- Genus: Allocasuarina
- Species: A. acutivalvis

Binomial name
- Allocasuarina acutivalvis (F.Muell.) L.A.S.Johnson
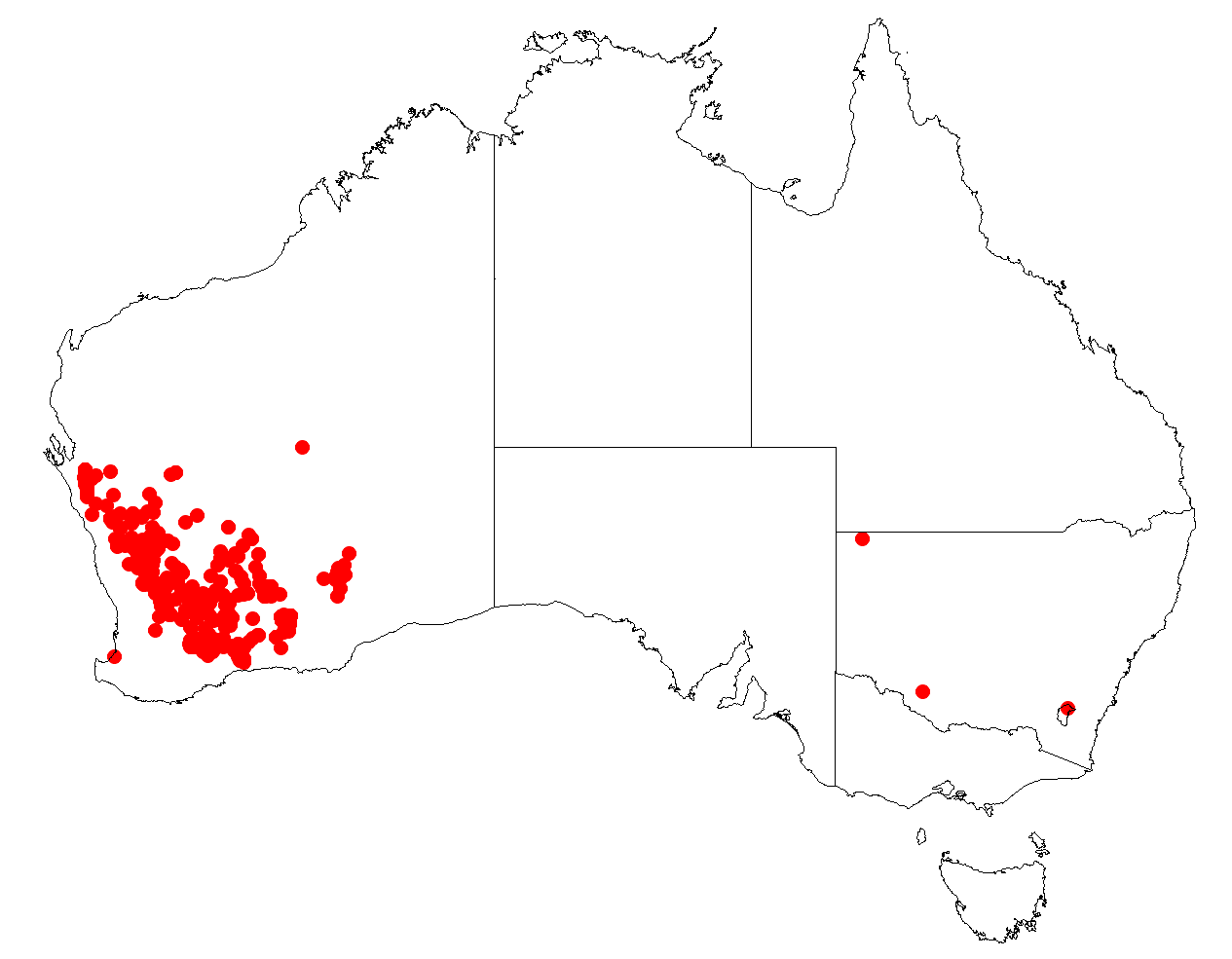
- Occurrence data from AVH

Synonyms
- Casuarina acutivalvis F.Muell.

= Allocasuarina acutivalvis =

Species of flowering plant

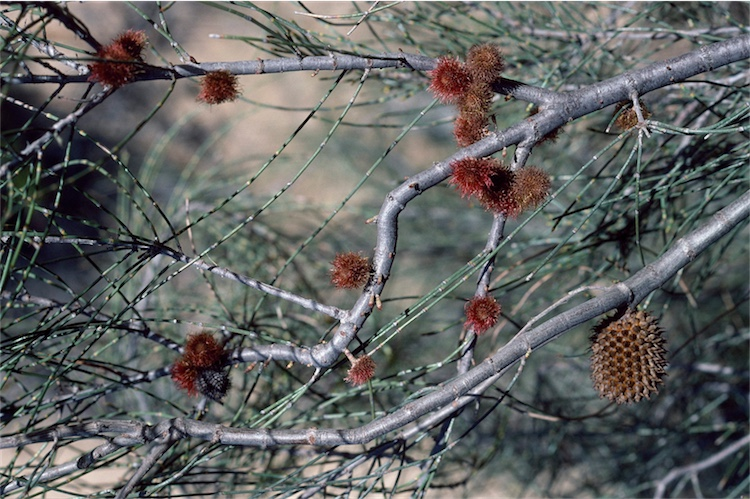
Female cones

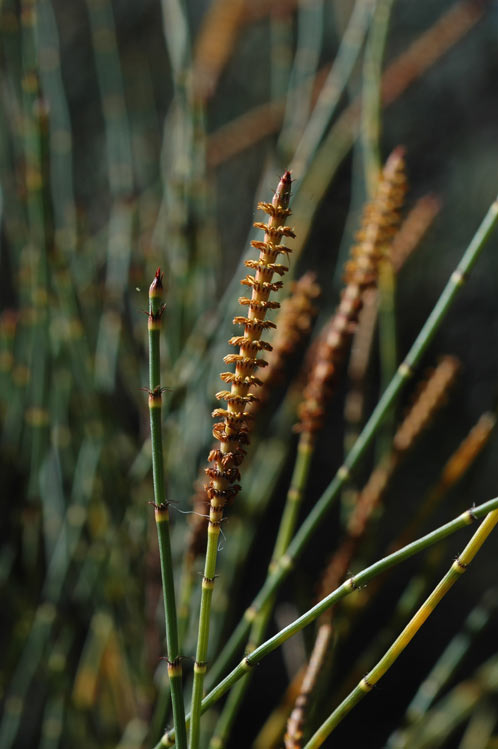
Male spike

Allocasuarina acutivalvis is a species of flowering plant in the family Casuarinaceae and is endemic to the southwest of Western Australia. It is a dioecious shrub to small tree that has erect branchlets, the leaves reduced to scales in whorls of 10 to 14, the fruiting cones 15–35 mm (0.59–1.38 in) long containing winged seeds (samaras) 6–12 mm (0.24–0.47 in) long.

== Description ==
Allocasuarina acutivalvis is a dioecious shrub to small tree that typically grows to a height of 3–8 m (9.8–26.2 ft). The branchlets are erect, up to 200 mm (7.9 in) long, the leaves reduced to erect, scale-like teeth 0.3–1.3 mm (0.012–0.051 in) long, arranged in whorls of 10 to 14 around the branchlets. The sections of branchlet between the leaf whorls (the "articles") are 10–25 mm (0.39–0.98 in) long and 0.7–1.2 mm (0.028–0.047 in) wide. The flowers on male trees are arranged in spikes resembling a string of beads 10–80 mm (0.39–3.15 in) long, the anthers 1.2–2.1 mm (0.047–0.083 in) long. The female cones are covered with fine, white hairs when young, and are sessile or on a peduncle up to 10 mm (0.39 in) long. Mature cones are 15–35 mm (0.59–1.38 in) long and 15–28 mm (0.59–1.10 in) in diameter, the samaras black or dark brown and 6–12 mm (0.24–0.47 in) long.

== Taxonomy ==
This species was first formally described in 1876 by the botanist Ferdinand von Mueller who gave it the name Casuarina acutivalvis in his Fragmenta Phytographiae Australiae. It was reclassified in 1982 into the genus Allocasuarina as A. acutivalvis by Lawrie Johnson in the Journal of the Adelaide Botanic Gardens. The specific epithet, (acutivalvis) means "sharply pointed lobes".

In the same journal, Johnson described two subspecies of A. acutivalvis, and the names are accepted by the Australian Plant Census:

- Allocasuarina acutivalvis (F.Muell.) L.A.S.Johnson subsp. acutivalvis has articles 10–25 mm (0.39–0.98 in) long with 10 to 14 teeth 0.3–1.3 mm (0.012–0.051 in) long, the cone body 15–35 mm (0.59–1.38 in) long and 15–20 mm (0.59–0.79 in) wide.
- Allocasuarina acutivalvis subsp. prinsepiana (C.R.P.Andrews) L.A.S.Johnson (previously known as Casuarina prinsepiana) has articles 12–20 mm (0.47–0.79 in) long with 11 to 13 teeth 0.4–1.0 mm (0.016–0.039 in) long, the cone body 25–32 mm (0.98–1.26 in) long and 18–22 mm (0.71–0.87 in) wide.

== Distribution and habitat ==
Allocasuarina acutivalvis grows in tall heath and open woodland, sometimes on rocky hillsides, and is widespread in the south-west of Western Australia from north of the Murchison River to Zanthus. Subspecies prinsepiana occurs from near Mullewa to near Merredin, surrounded by and sometimes intergrading with subsp. acutivalvis.

== Conservation status ==
Both subspecies of A. acutivalvis are listed as "not threatened" by the Western Australian Government Department of Biodiversity, Conservation and Attractions.
