= Windabout, Western Australia =

Locality in the Shire of Esperance, Western Australia

Windabout
- Suburb
- Coordinates: 33.82064°S 121.90777°E
- Country: Australia
- State: Western Australia
- LGA(s): Shire of Esperance
- Location: 602 km (374 mi) SE of Perth; 186 km (116 mi) S of Norseman; 5 km (3.1 mi) N of Esperance

Government
  - State electorate(s): Roe
  - Federal division(s): O'Connor

Area
  - Total: 4 km^{2} (1.5 sq mi)

Population
  - Total(s): 124 (SAL 2021)
- Postcode: 6450
Suburbs around Windabout
| Monjingup | Myrup | Myrup |
| Chadwick | Windabout | Bandy Creek |
| Chadwick | Castletown | Bandy Creek |

Windabout is a suburb of Esperance and a locality of the Shire of Esperance in the Goldfields-Esperance region of Western Australia. The suburb is residential in the south-east, while the west is taken up by Esperance golf course and the north by parts of the Woody Lake Nature Reserve.

Windabout is on the traditional land of the Njunga people of the Noongar nation. The Njunga were previously part of the Wudjari Noongar, but separated from them for cultural reasons.

Lake Windabout lays to the north of the locality, in the nature reserve, while there is also a Windabout Lake in South Australia.
