= Neridup, Western Australia =

Locality in the Shire of Esperance, Western Australia

Neridup
- Interactive map of Neridup
- Coordinates: 33.65261°S 122.21019°E
- Country: Australia
- State: Western Australia
- LGA: Shire of Esperance
- Location: 626 km (389 mi) SE of Perth; 172 km (107 mi) S of Norseman; 36 km (22 mi) NE of Esperance

Government
  - State electorate: Roe
  - Federal division: O'Connor

Area
  - Total: 859.4 km^{2} (331.8 sq mi)

Population
  - Total: 92 (SAL 2021)
- Postcode: 6450
Localities around Neridup
Scaddan	Wittenoom Hills	Mount Ney
Gibson	Neridup	Condingup
Myrup	Merivale	Condingup

Neridup is a rural locality of the Shire of Esperance in the Goldfields-Esperance region of Western Australia. A large part of the Kau Rock Nature Reserve is located in the north-east of Neridup.

Neridup is on the traditional land of the Njunga people of the Noongar nation. The Njunga were previously part of the Wudjari Noongar, but separated from them for cultural reasons.

The Kau Rock Nature Reserve, which also stretches into neighbouring Wittenoom Hills and Mount Ney, was gazetted on 2 August 1974, has a size of 158.14 square kilometres (61.06 mi^{2}), and is located in the Mallee bioregion.
