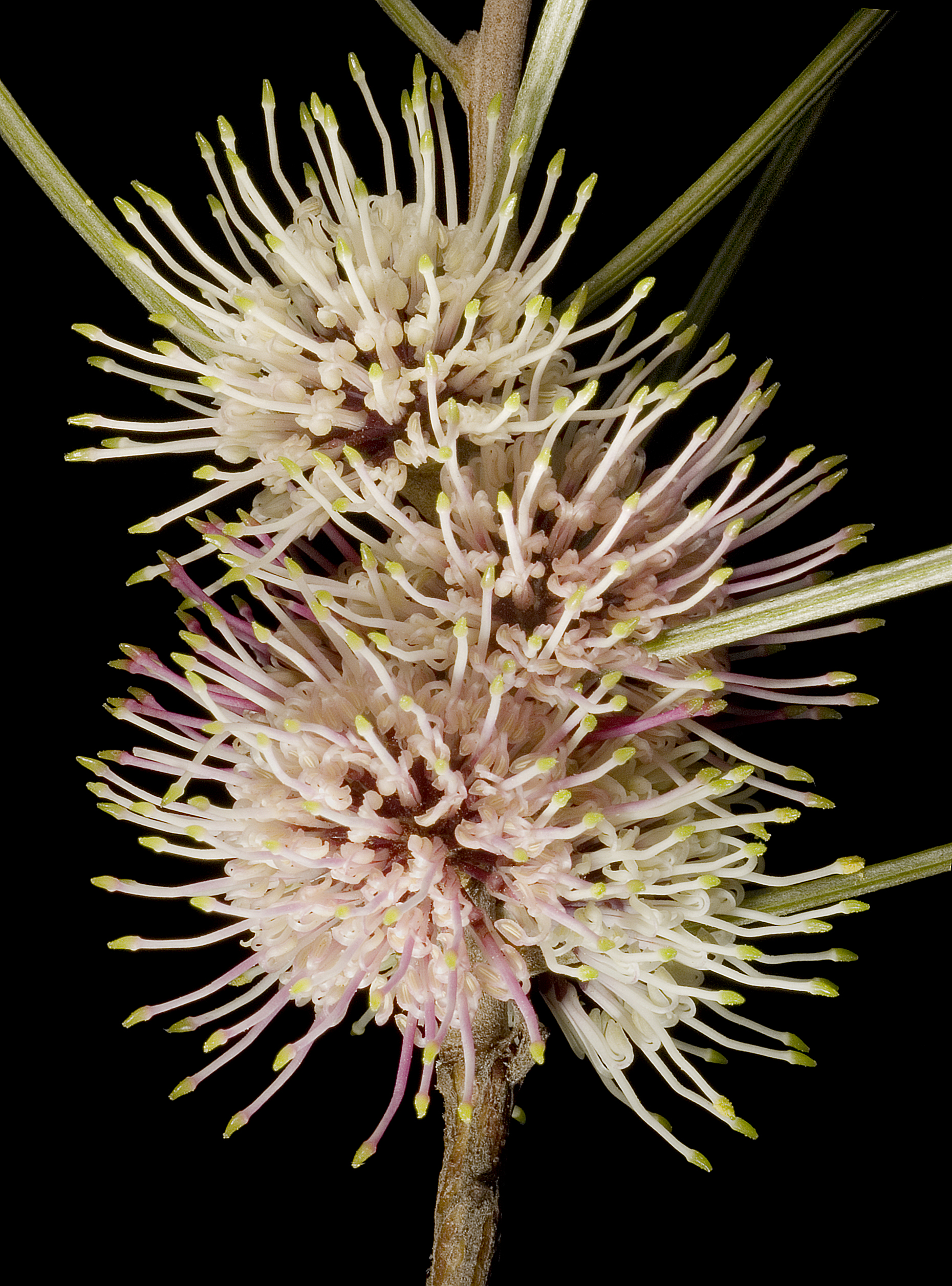
- Subsp. scoparia

Conservation status
- Vulnerable (IUCN 3.1)

Scientific classification
- Kingdom: Plantae
- Clade: Tracheophytes
- Clade: Angiosperms
- Clade: Eudicots
- Order: Proteales
- Family: Proteaceae
- Genus: Hakea
- Species: H. scoparia

Binomial name
- Hakea scoparia Meisn.

Subspecies
- Hakea scoparia Meisn. subsp. scoparia; Hakea scoparia subsp. trycherica Haegi
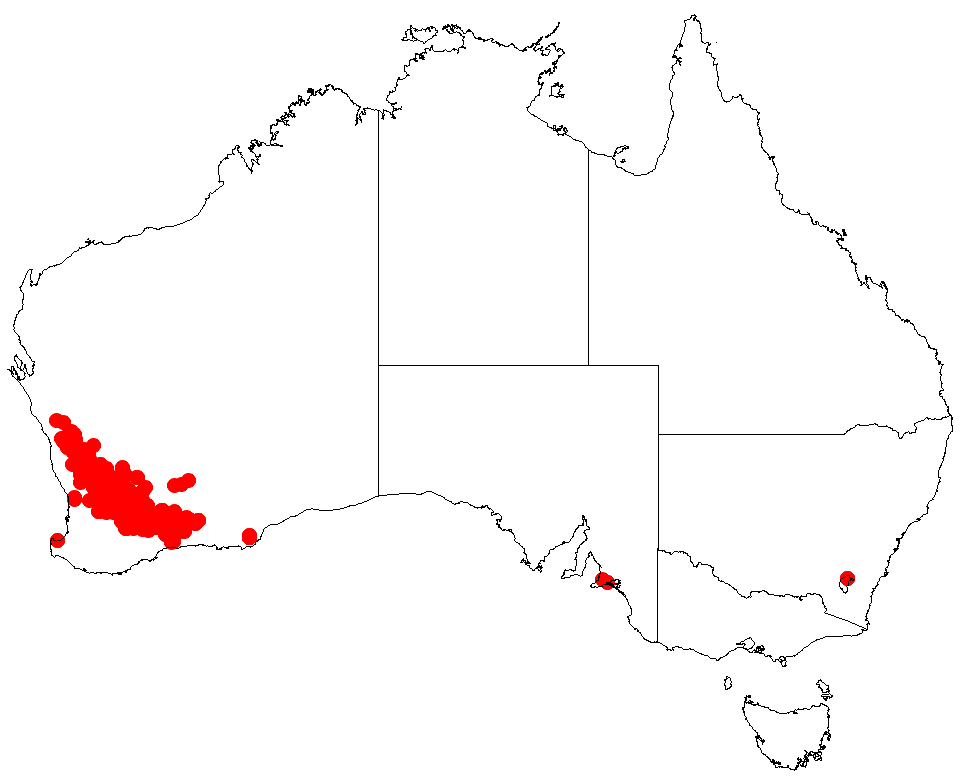
- Occurrence data from Australasian Virtual Herbarium

= Hakea scoparia =

Species of shrub endemic to Western Australia

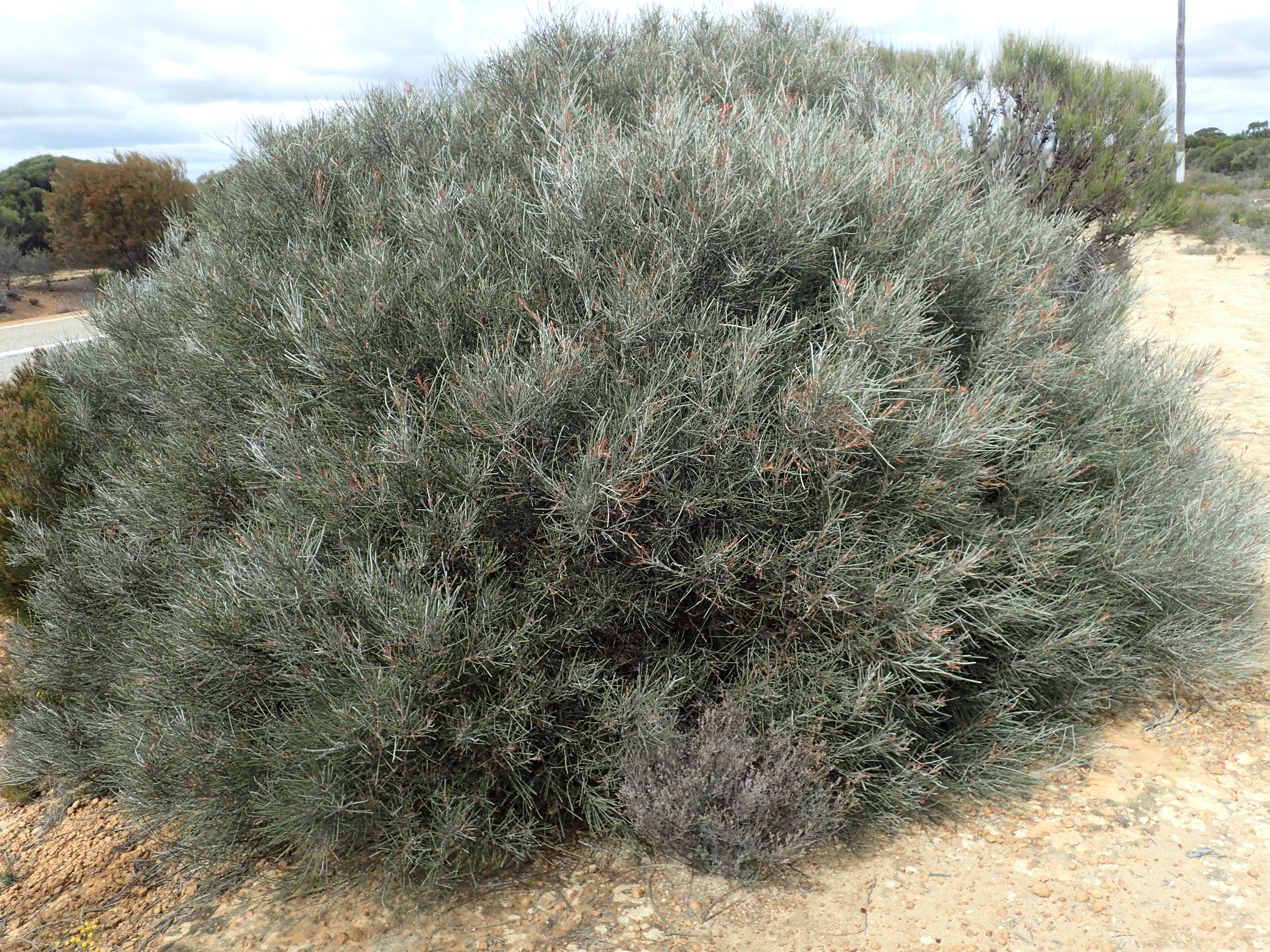
Habit in the Lake Hurlstone Nature Reserve, near the Hyden - Lake King Road

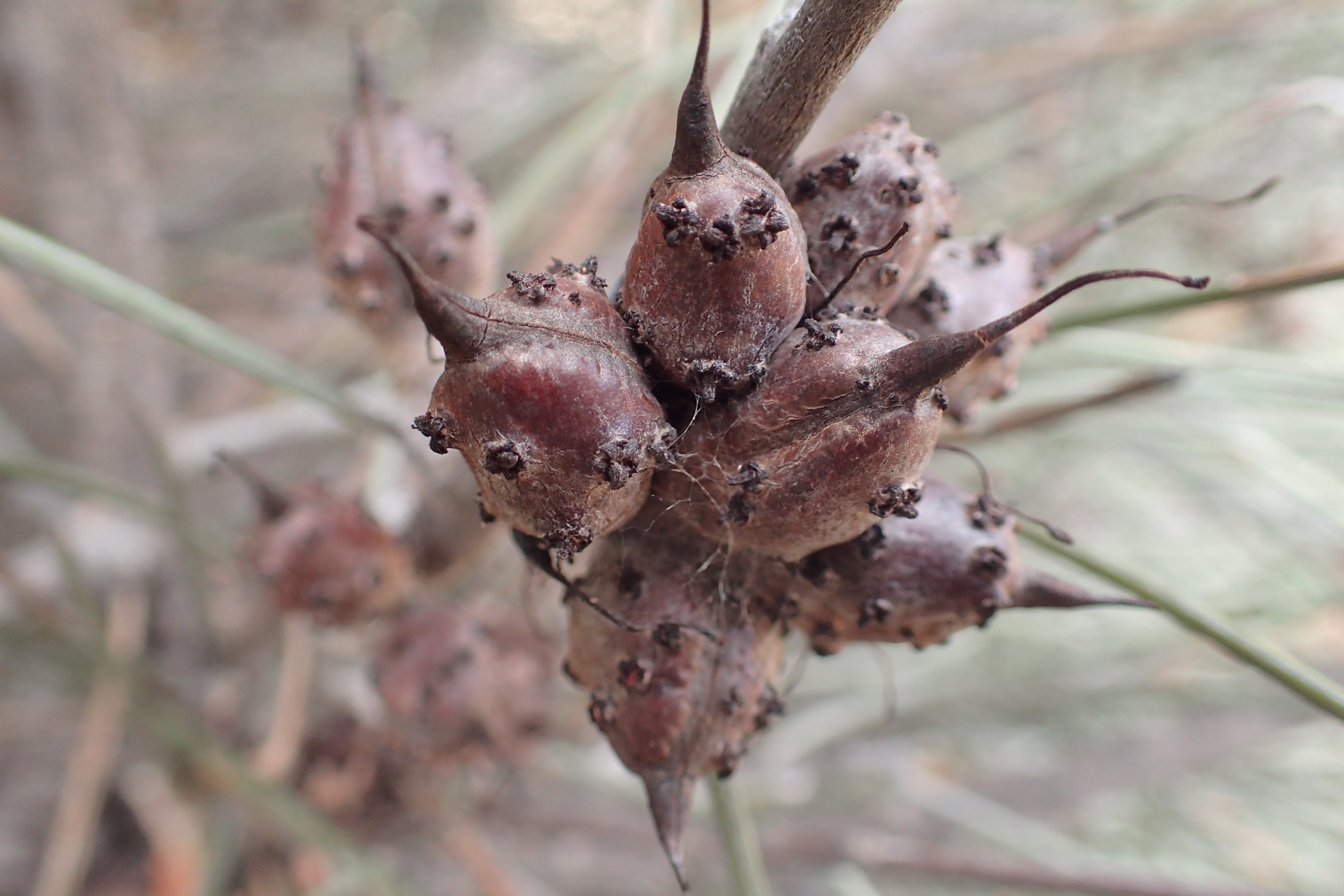
Fruit

Hakea scoparia is a species of flowering plant in the family Proteaceae and is endemic to the south-west of Western Australia where it grows in shrubland. It is a shrub with ascending branches, terete leaves and clusters of cream to pinkish flowers in leaf axils from June to September.

== Description ==
Hakea scoparia is a rounded, many-stemmed shrub with smooth bark, ascending branches, 1–3.5 m (3–10 ft) high and does not form a lignotuber. The inflorescence consists of 50-70 pinkish-cream coloured flowers that appear in clusters in the leaf axils. The pedicels are smooth, the perianth cream coloured ageing to pink or orange-pink and the pistil 13–15 mm (0.51–0.59 in) long. The branchlets are densely covered in short, soft matted hairs or short, soft silky hairs at flowering time. Sometimes sparsely smooth without hairs. The leaves are more or less needle-shaped, 12–27 cm (5–10 in) long and 1.5–2 mm (0.059–0.079 in) in diameter. The leaves grow alternately and have 5 longitudinal veins along their length. Three dimensional rough textured seed capsules are approximately 2 cm (0.8 in) long and 1 cm (0.4 in) wide, ending in a short prominent beak. The fruit grow in groups of 1-8 per axil on a short stalk.

== Taxonomy and naming ==
Hakea scoparia was first formally described in 1845 by the Swiss botanist Carl Meissner in Plantae Preissianae. His description was based on plant material collected from the environs of the Swan River by James Drummond. The specific epithet (scoparia) is derived from the Latin word scopa meaning "broom" a reference to the foliage.

Two subspecies are recognised by the Australian Plant Census; Hakea scoparia subsp. scoparia and Hakea scoparia subsp. trycherica.

== Distribution and habitat ==
Hakea scoparia is a widespread species mainly across the wheatbelt region of Western Australia, from south of Northampton to Dumbleyung and extending in the east to Yilgarn. It grows in heath and scrubland in yellow sand over laterite, gravel, sandy-clay and loam.

== Conservation status ==
Hakea scoparia is classified as vulnerable on the IUCN Red List of Threatened Species and as "not threatened" by the Western Australian Government Department of Parks and Wildlife. Historically, much of its habitat was cleared to make way for agricultural development, mainly during the 1960s, which has resulted in a population decline of approximately 30%. Today, many populations of Hakea scoparia are confined to road verges. These populations are prone to additional land clearing for road maintenance, as well as runoff from phosphate fertilizer used in agriculture, weed invasion, increasing soil salinity and increased droughts associated with climate change.
