= Mount Ney, Western Australia =

Locality in the Shire of Esperance, Western Australia

Mount Ney
- Interactive map of Mount Ney
- Coordinates: 33.33924°S 122.37144°E
- Country: Australia
- State: Western Australia
- LGA: Shire of Esperance
- Location: 635 km (395 mi) SE of Perth; 146 km (91 mi) SE of Norseman; 72 km (45 mi) NE of Esperance

Government
  - State electorate: Roe
  - Federal division: O'Connor

Area
  - Total: 1,018.9 km^{2} (393.4 sq mi)

Population
  - Total: 8 (SAL 2021)
- Postcode: 6447
Localities around Mount Ney
Buraminya	Buraminya	Buraminya
Grass Patch	Mount Ney	Beaumont
Wittenoom Hills	Neridup	Condingup

Mount Ney is a rural locality of the Shire of Esperance in the Goldfields-Esperance region of Western Australia. Parts of the Kau Rock Nature Reserve and all of the Mount Ney Nature Reserve are located within Mount Ney, the latter centred around the 328-metre-high (1,076 ft) mountain of the same name.

Mount Ney is on the traditional land of the Njunga people of the Noongar nation. The Njunga were previously part of the Wudjari Noongar, but separated from them for cultural reasons.

The Kau Rock Nature Reserve, which also stretches into neighbouring Wittenoom Hills and Neridup, was gazetted on 2 August 1974, has a size of 158.14 square kilometres (61.06 mi^{2}) and is located in the Mallee bioregion. The Mount Ney Nature Reserve was gazetted on 2 August 1974, has a size of 6.1 square kilometres (2.4 mi^{2}), and is also located in the Mallee bioregion.

No major roads traverse the locality and all roads within it are unsealed.
