= Wittenoom Hills, Western Australia =

Locality in the Shire of Esperance, Western Australia

Wittenoom Hills
- Interactive map of Wittenoom Hills
- Coordinates: 33.45960°S 122.18626°E
- Country: Australia
- State: Western Australia
- LGA: Shire of Esperance
- Location: 614 km (382 mi) SE of Perth; 142 km (88 mi) S of Norseman; 55 km (34 mi) NE of Esperance

Government
  - State electorate: Roe
  - Federal division: O'Connor

Area
  - Total: 549.7 km^{2} (212.2 sq mi)

Population
  - Total: 16 (SAL 2021)
- Postcode: 6447
Localities around Wittenoom Hills
Scaddan	Mount Ney	Mount Ney
Scaddan	Wittenoom Hills	Mount Ney
Scaddan	Neridup	Neridup

Wittenoom Hills is a rural locality of the Shire of Esperance in the Goldfields-Esperance region of Western Australia. A substantial part of the locality is covered by nature reserves, established in 1966 and 1974. The Wittenoom Hills are a range of hills with Mount Burdett, 271 metres (889 ft) high, as its most prominent point.

Wittenoom Hills is on the traditional land of the Njunga people of the Noongar nation. The Njunga were previously part of the Wudjari Noongar, but separated from them for cultural reasons.

== Nature reserves ==
The following nature reserves are located within Wittenoom Hills. All are located in the Mallee bioregion, with the Burdett and Burdett South Nature Reserves also stretching into the Esperance Plains bioregion:

- Burdett Nature Reserve was gazetted on 18 March 1966 and has a size of 0.71 square kilometres (0.27 mi^{2}).
- Burdett North Nature Reserve was gazetted on 25 February 1966 and has a size of 8.12 square kilometres (3.14 mi^{2}).
- Burdett South Nature Reserve was gazetted on 18 February 1966 and has a size of 44.67 square kilometres (17.25 mi^{2}).
- Kau Rock Nature Reserve, which also stretches into neighbouring Neridup and Mount Ney, was gazetted on 2 August 1974 and has a size of 158.14 square kilometres (61.06 mi^{2}).
- Mount Burdett Nature Reserve was gazetted on 18 February 1966 and has a size of 6.05 square kilometres (2.34 mi^{2}).
- Mount Ridley Nature Reserve was gazetted on 25 February 1966 and has a size of 14.17 square kilometres (5.47 mi^{2}).
