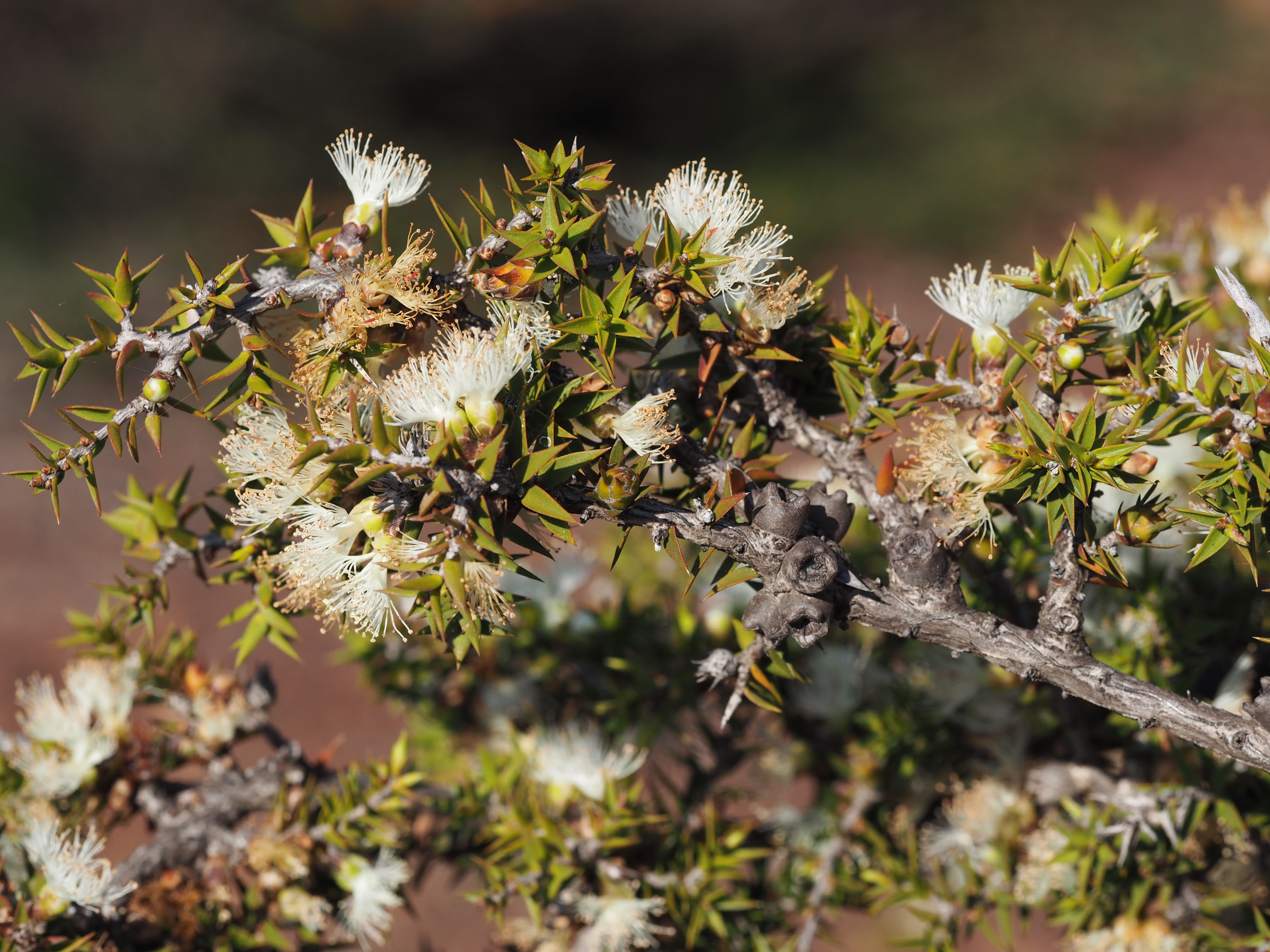

Scientific classification
- Kingdom: Plantae
- Clade: Tracheophytes
- Clade: Angiosperms
- Clade: Eudicots
- Clade: Rosids
- Order: Myrtales
- Family: Myrtaceae
- Genus: Melaleuca
- Species: M. marginata

Binomial name
- Melaleuca marginata (Sond.) Hislop, Lepschi & Craven

Synonyms
- Melaleuca cardiophylla var. parviflora Benth.; Melaleuca coronicarpa D.A.Herb.

= Melaleuca marginata =

Species of shrub

Melaleuca marginata is a shrub in the myrtle family, Myrtaceae and is endemic to the south-west of Western Australia. It is distinguished by its prickly leaves and its flowers occurring in long sections of the branches. From 1922 to 2011 was known as Melaleuca coronicarpa.

== Description ==
Melaleuca marginata is a prickly shrub, growing to a height of about 2 m (7 ft). The leaves are arranged alternately along the stem, more or less oval in shape, 5–14.6 mm (0.2–0.6 in) long and 1–6.6 mm (0.04–0.3 in) wide, crescent-shaped in cross section and tapering to a pointed, sharp end.

The white flowers are in clusters of up to 25 flowers along the sides of the branches, each cluster up to 30 mm (1 in) in diameter. The style is 7–11 mm (0.3–0.4 in) long. The petals are 2.1–3.5 mm (0.08–0.1 in) long and fall off as the flower ages. The stamens are arranged in five bundles around the flower, each bundle containing between 10 and 22 stamens. Flowering occurs mainly in early spring and is followed by fruit which are woody capsules, with the sepals remaining as five teeth on each cup-shaped fruit.

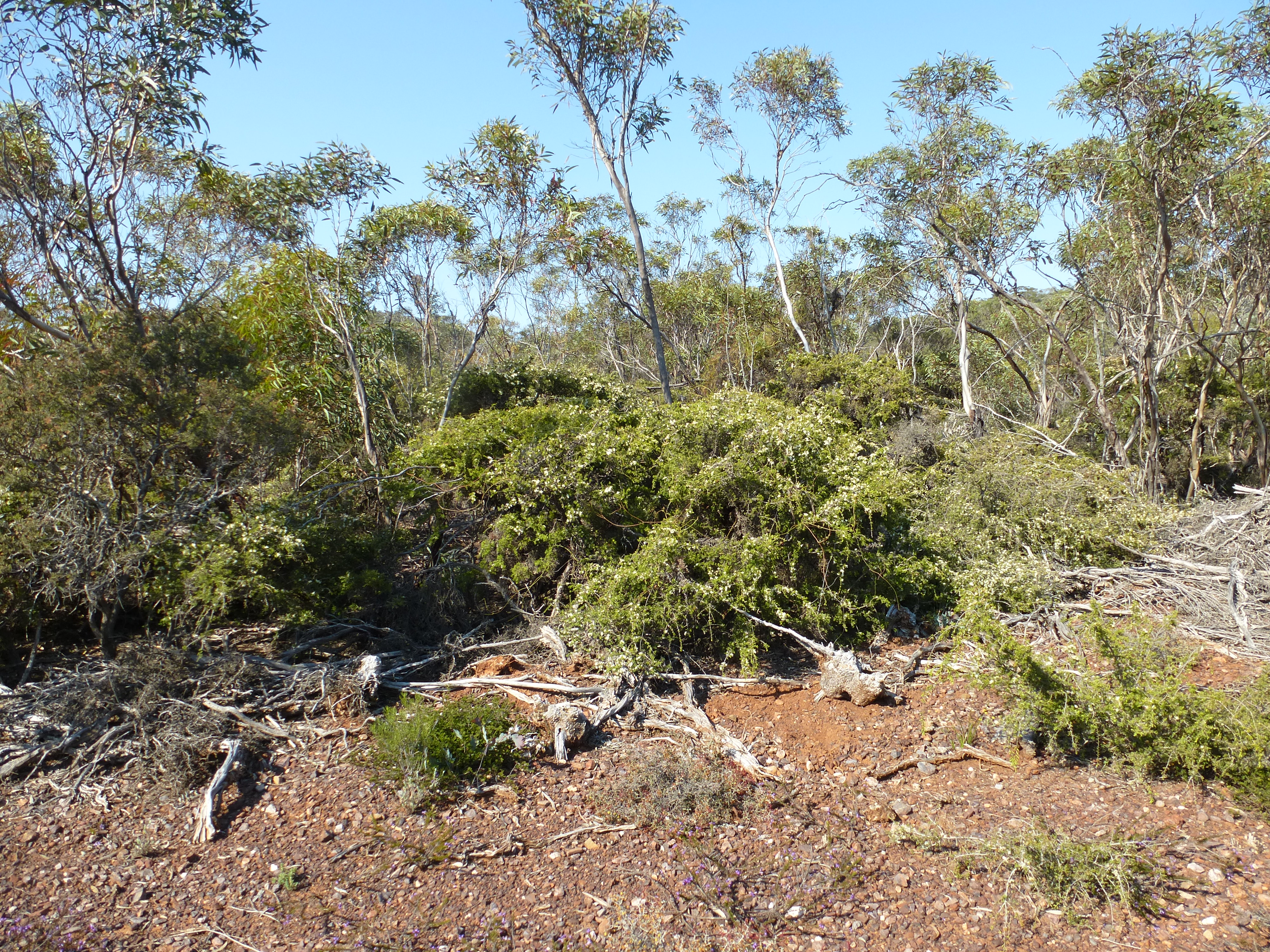
Habit 10 km (6.2 mi) east of Ravensthorpe

== Taxonomy and naming ==
Melaleuca coronicarpa was described in 1922 by Desmond Herbert however, a specimen formally described in 1845 by Otto Wilhelm Sonder as Astroloma marginatum was recognised in 2011 as the same species as the one named by Herbert. The type specimen described by Herbert was also found to be within the range of Melaleuca coronicarpa. Since the Sonder description had priority, it was renamed by Michael Hislop, Brendan Lepschi and Lyndley Craven. The name for this species is therefore now Melaleuca marginata. The specific epithet (marginata) is a Latin word meaning "border" or "margin" and refers to the distinctive leaf margin.

== Distribution and habitat ==
Melaleuca marginata occurs from the Chapman Valley district south to the Ongerup district and east toward the Koorda and Grass Patch districts in the Avon Wheatbelt, Coolgardie, Esperance Plains, Geraldton Sandplains, Jarrah Forest and Mallee biogeographic regions. It grows in sand including lateritic sand, loam and clay, on sandy ridges, eroded laterite and undulating plains.

== Conservation ==
Melaleuca marginata is listed as not threatened by the Government of Western Australia Department of Parks and Wildlife.
