= Eastern Mallee =

Biogeographic region in Western Australia

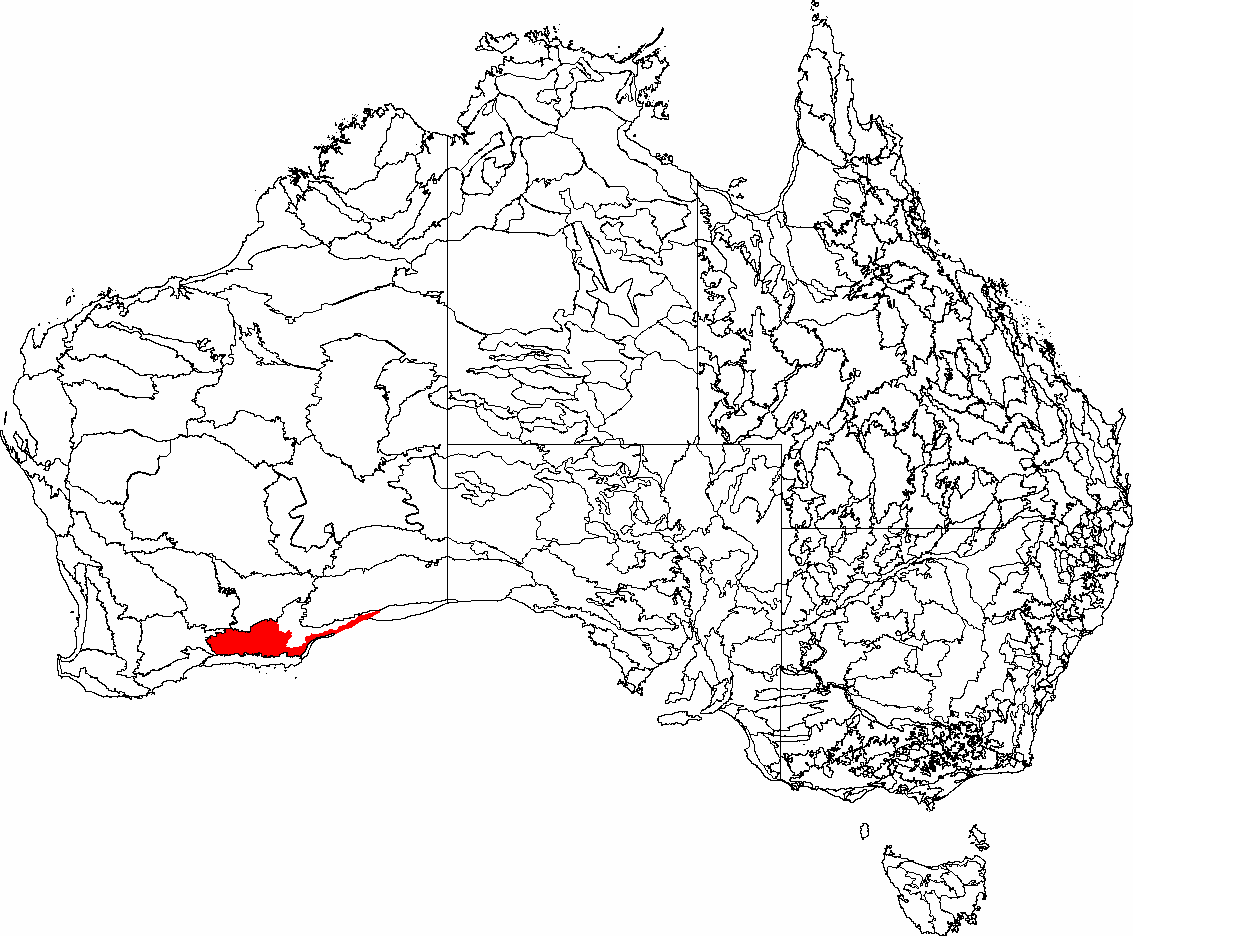
The IBRA subregions, with Eastern Mallee in red

Eastern Mallee is an Interim Biogeographic Regionalisation for Australia (IBRA) subregion in southern Western Australia.

== Geography ==
Eastern Mallee is roughly defined as the eastern half of the Mallee biogeographic region. It has an area of around 46,000 square kilometres, and is very sparsely populated. The only towns occur along the road from Esperance to Norseman. The largest and best known town is Salmon Gums; others include Scaddan, Grass Patch, Red Lake and Dowak, Western Australia.

Watercourses in the area include Young River, Lort River, Oldfield River and Jerdacuttup River. Drainage is occluded, however, and the area has numerous salt pans.

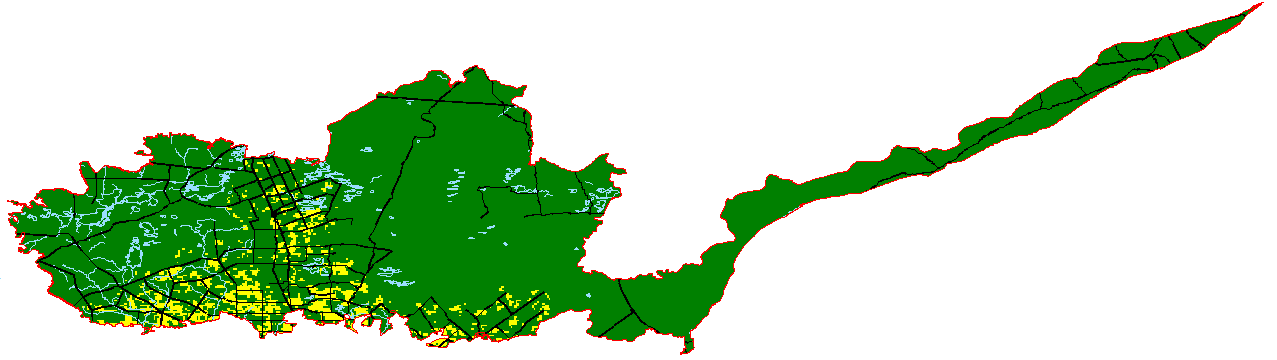
The Eastern Mallee subregion, with agricultural areas in yellow, and native vegetation in green

== Geology ==
Situated on the south-eastern edge of the Yilgarn craton, Eastern Mallee has a gently undulating landscape. It has a variety of surface types, including calcareous clays and loams containing kankar; outcrops of metamorphosed sandstone; white and yellow sand; and loamy pan fields. Gypsum dunes also occur in the area.

== Climate ==
Western Mallee is semi-arid, with a warm, dry, Mediterranean climate, and a winter rainfall of 300 and 500 millimetres (12–19 in).

Climatic Table for Salmon Gums, a town in the Mallee region
	Jan	Feb	Mar	Apr	May	Jun	Jul	Aug	Sep	Oct	Nov	Dec	Year
Mean daily maximum temperature	30.5 °C; 86.9 °F	29.5 °C; 85.1 °F	27.2 °C; 81.0 °F	23.5 °C; 74.3 °F	19.6 °C; 67.3 °F	16.8 °C; 62.2 °F	16.0 °C; 60.8 °F	17.2 °C; 63.0 °F	20.4 °C; 68.7 °F	23.2 °C; 73.8 °F	26.1 °C; 79.0 °F	28.9 °C; 84.0 °F	23.2 °C; 73.8 °F
Mean daily minimum temperature	14.0 °C; 57.2 °F	14.2 °C; 57.6 °F	12.7 °C; 54.9 °F	10.0 °C; 50.0 °F	7.2 °C; 45.0 °F	5.6 °C; 42.1 °F	4.6 °C; 40.3 °F	4.7 °C; 40.5 °F	5.8 °C; 42.4 °F	7.5 °C; 45.5 °F	10.1 °C; 50.2 °F	12.3 °C; 54.1 °F	9.0 °C; 48.2 °F
Mean total rainfall	19.3 mm 0.7 in	23.4 mm 0.9 in	23.1 mm 0.9 in	26.0 mm 1.0 in	35.1 mm 1.4 in	40.9 mm 1.6 in	36.7 mm 1.4 in	33.9 mm 1.3 in	31.5 mm 1.2 in	26.8 mm 1.0 in	25.8 mm 1.0 in	19.3 mm 0.7 in	341.9 mm 13.2 in
Mean number of rain days	3.9	4.1	4.9	7.1	9.4	10.8	11.9	11.5	9.7	7.7	5.7	4.2	90.9
Source: Bureau of Meteorology

== Vegetation ==
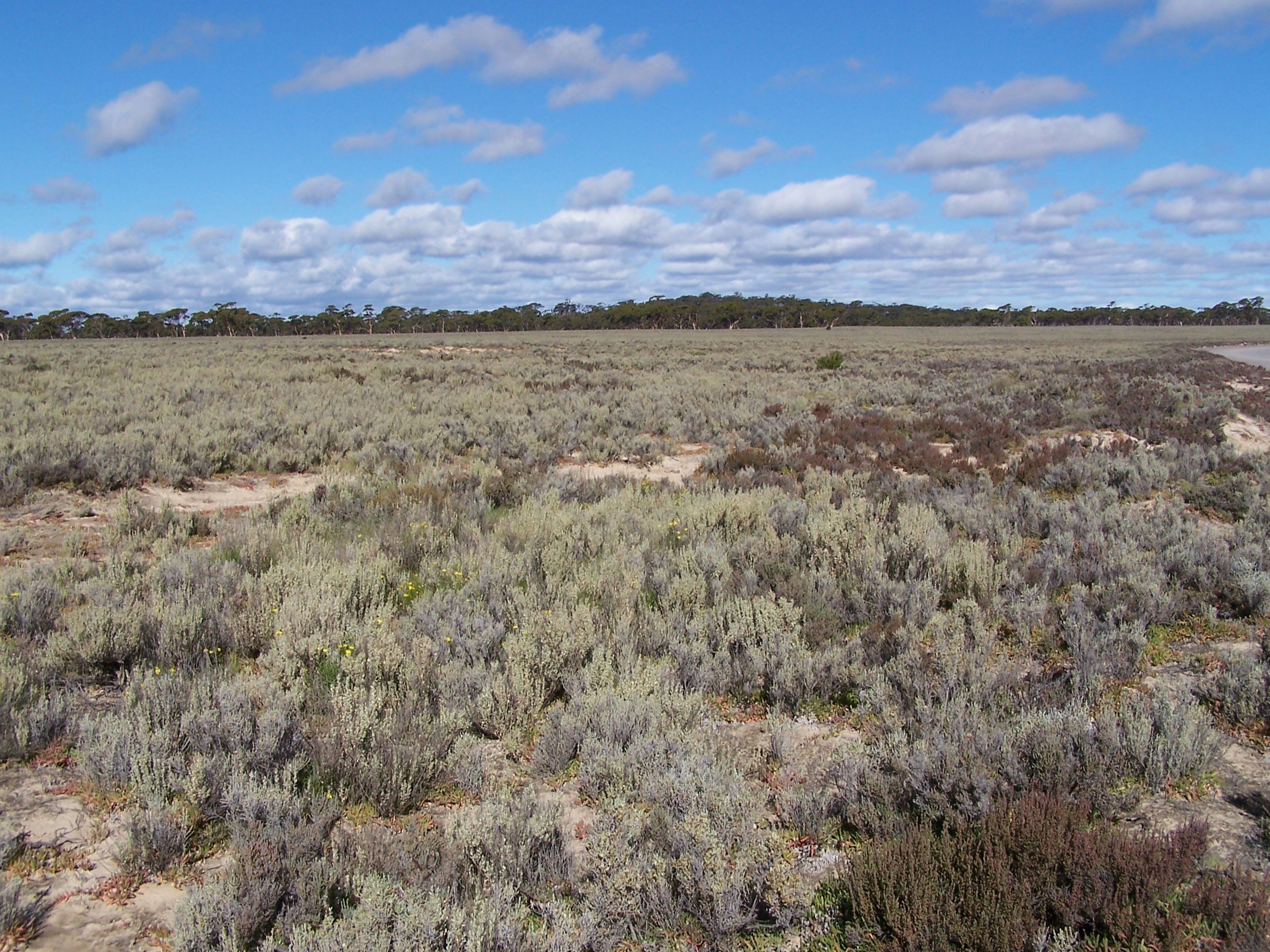
Tecticornia low shrublands bordering Lake Johnston, with Eucalyptus mallee on the horizon

Only about 34% of the subregion retains its native vegetation. Within this area, most soil types carry mallee communities consisting primarily of Eucalyptus species. Clay soils support patches of Eucalyptus woodland in addition to mallee, and calcareous clay areas are vegetated by communities of mallee with Melaleuca pauperiflora (Boree). Myrtaceous and proteaceous scrub-heath occurs in sandstone areas, and salt affected areas grow Tecticornia (Samphire).

There are also a number of vegetation communities of lesser extent, including some that are considered endangered or at risk. These include vulnerable thicket communities of the Russell Range, and a vulnerable ecological community of herb and bunch grasslands that occurs on gypsum dunes along the margins of salt lakes. Granite outcrops also have their own characteristic vegetation.

== Flora and fauna ==
Information on Eastern Mallee's flora and fauna is scarce, as the area has not had a thorough biodiversity survey. What information is available has been gathered in the context of conservation assessment:

The subregion contains many endemic plant species in the Eucalyptus and Acacia genera. It contains numerous rare, endangered and priority flora. Declared rare flora include Adenanthos eyrei (Toolinna adenanthos), Anigozanthos bicolor subsp. minor, Conostylis lepidospermoides (sedge conostylis), Drummondita longifolia, Eremophila denticulata subsp. denticulata (toothed eremophila), Eremophila lactea, Eucalyptus merrickiae, Leucopogon marginatus, Myoporum turbinatum and Ricinocarpos trichophorus.

It also supports a number of rare or endangered fauna, including the mammals western quoll (Dasyurus geoffroii) and dibbler (Parantechinus apicalis); the birds short-billed black-cockatoo (Calyptorhynchus latirostris), slender-billed thornbill (Acanthiza iredalei iredalei), malleefowl (Leipoa ocellata), western whipbird (Psophodes nigrogularis), crested shrike-tit (Falcunculus frontatus) and hooded plover (Charadrius rubricollis); and the carpet python (Morelia spilota). Coastal areas are also visited by the shy albatross (Thalassarche cauta), the Australian sea lion (Neophoca cinerea) and the southern right whale (Eubalaena australis).

== Land use ==
Around a quarter of Eastern Mallee falls within what the Department of Agriculture and Food terms the "Intensive Land-use Zone" (ILZ), the area of Western Australia that has been largely cleared and developed for intensive agriculture such as cropping and livestock production. The remaining three quarters of the subregion falls within the "Extensive Land-use Zone" (ELZ), where the native vegetation has not been cleared but may have been degraded by the grazing of introduced animals and/or changes to the fire regime. In total, around 70% of Eastern Mallee retains its native vegetation.

Somewhat less than 15% of the subregion is held within nature reserves, covering about 34% of the remaining native vegetation. Prominent nature reserves include Frank Hann National Park, Peak Charles National Park and Cape Arid National Park. There is also substantial mining in the area, with large areas covered by mines, mining tenements or exploration leases. There is also a small amount of gypsum mining in the area, and some plantation forestry.

Little is done to manage the subregion for conservation purposes, as most reserves are relatively undisturbed giving it a low management priority. Rising salinity is a threat in cleared areas, and this is completely unmanaged. The threat of bushfire is managed by the maintenance of firebreaks and fire access tracks. There is no management of feral rabbits and foxes, and incursions of agricultural weeds.

The subregion was given a Continental Stress Class of 4 when measured against the criteria, but the authors of that assessment stated that it should more properly be rated at 3, because of the threat of salinity, and because clearance of western parts has resulted in a biased reserve system.

== Biogeography ==
Eastern Mallee was introduced in IBRA Version 6.1. Its region code is MAL1. It is one of two subregions of the Mallee region, the other being Western Mallee. The Mallee, Avon Wheatbelt and Geraldton Sandplains regions together comprise Hopper's Transitional Rainfall Zone of Beard's South West Botanical Province. Under the World Wide Fund for Nature's regionalisation of the world's terrestrial surface into "ecoregions", the Western Mallee subregion falls within the Esperance Mallee ecoregion, one of 6 ecoregions comprising the Southwest Australia ecozone.
