= Leioproctus strigatus =

Scientific classification
- Kingdom: Animalia
- Phylum: Arthropoda
- Clade: Pancrustacea
- Class: Insecta
- Order: Hymenoptera
- Family: Colletidae
- Genus: Leioproctus
- Species: L. strigatus

Binomial name
- Leioproctus strigatus Batley, 2025

Species of bee

Leioproctus strigatus, or Leioproctus (Euryglossidia) strigatus, is a species of bee in the family Colletidae and subfamily Colletinae. It is endemic to Australia. It was described by entomologist Michael Batley in 2025.

== Etymology ==
The specific epithet strigatus is an anatomical reference to the fine striation on the propodeal triangle.

== Description ==
The female body length is 5.5 mm, the male 5.0 mm. Integumental colouration is mainly black, the metasoma dark brown. The hair is white to brown.

== Distribution and habitat ==
The species occurs in south-west Western Australia. The type locality is Peak Charles National Park in the Eastern Mallee bioregion.

== Behaviour ==
The adults are flying mellivores.
