= Eucalyptus rigens =

Saltlake mallee

Conservation status
- Endangered (IUCN 3.1)

Scientific classification
- Kingdom: Plantae
- Clade: Tracheophytes
- Clade: Angiosperms
- Clade: Eudicots
- Clade: Rosids
- Order: Myrtales
- Family: Myrtaceae
- Genus: Eucalyptus
- Species: E. rigens

Binomial name
- Eucalyptus rigens Brooker & Hopper

Species of eucalyptus

Eucalyptus rigens, commonly known as saltlake mallee, is a species of sprawling mallee that is endemic to the southwest of Western Australia. It has smooth bark, lance-shaped adult leaves, flower buds in groups of three on a flattened peduncle and sessile, ribbed fruit.

== Description ==
Eucalyptus rigens is a sprawling, sometimes almost prostrate mallee that typically grows to a height of 4 m (13 ft). It has smooth grey over white bark that peels in strips. Young plants and coppice regrowth have leaves that are up to 130 mm (5.1 in) long and 50 mm (2.0 in) wide. Adult leaves are the same shade of greyish to light green on both sides, lance-shaped, up to 110 mm (4.3 in) long and 25 mm (0.98 in) wide, firm, stiff and often erect. The flower buds are arranged in leaf axils in groups of three on a strongly flattened peduncle up to 5 mm (0.20 in) long. Mature buds are oval, ribbed, up to 14 mm (0.55 in) long and 9 mm (0.35 in) wide with a ribbed, conical operculum. Flowering occurs from July to September and the flowers are creamy white. The fruit is a woody, sessile, cup-shaped or conical capsule 13 mm (0.51 in) long and wide with the valves near rim level.

== Taxonomy and naming ==
Eucalyptus rigens was first formally described by the botanists Ian Brooker and Stephen Hopper in 1989 in the journal Nuytsia from material they collected in the Truslove Nature Reserve near Grass Patch. The specific epithet (rigens) is a Latin word meaning "stiff" or "rigid", referring to the leaves.

== Distribution and habitat ==
Saltlake mallee grows in sandy soils around the edges of salt lakes, usually in mallee shrubland, to the north and north-east of Esperance.

== Conservation status ==
This mallee is classified as "not threatened" by the Western Australian Government Department of Parks and Wildlife.

== See also ==
- List of Eucalyptus species
