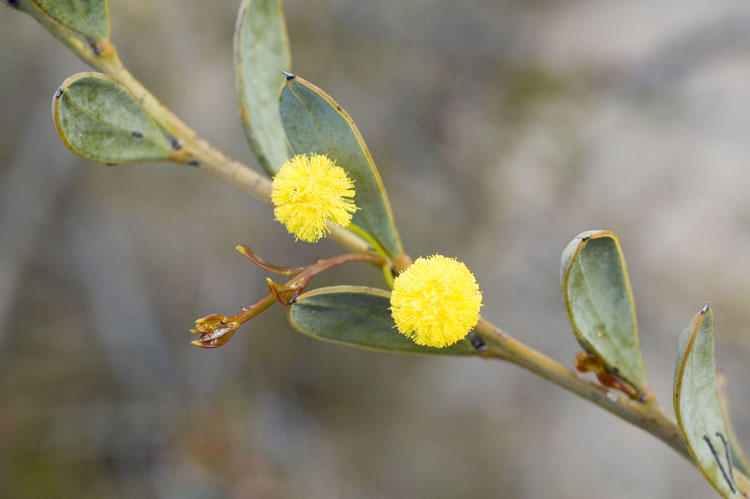

Scientific classification
- Kingdom: Plantae
- Clade: Tracheophytes
- Clade: Angiosperms
- Clade: Eudicots
- Clade: Rosids
- Order: Fabales
- Family: Fabaceae
- Subfamily: Caesalpinioideae
- Clade: Mimosoid clade
- Genus: Acacia
- Species: A. glaucissima

Binomial name
- Acacia glaucissima Maslin
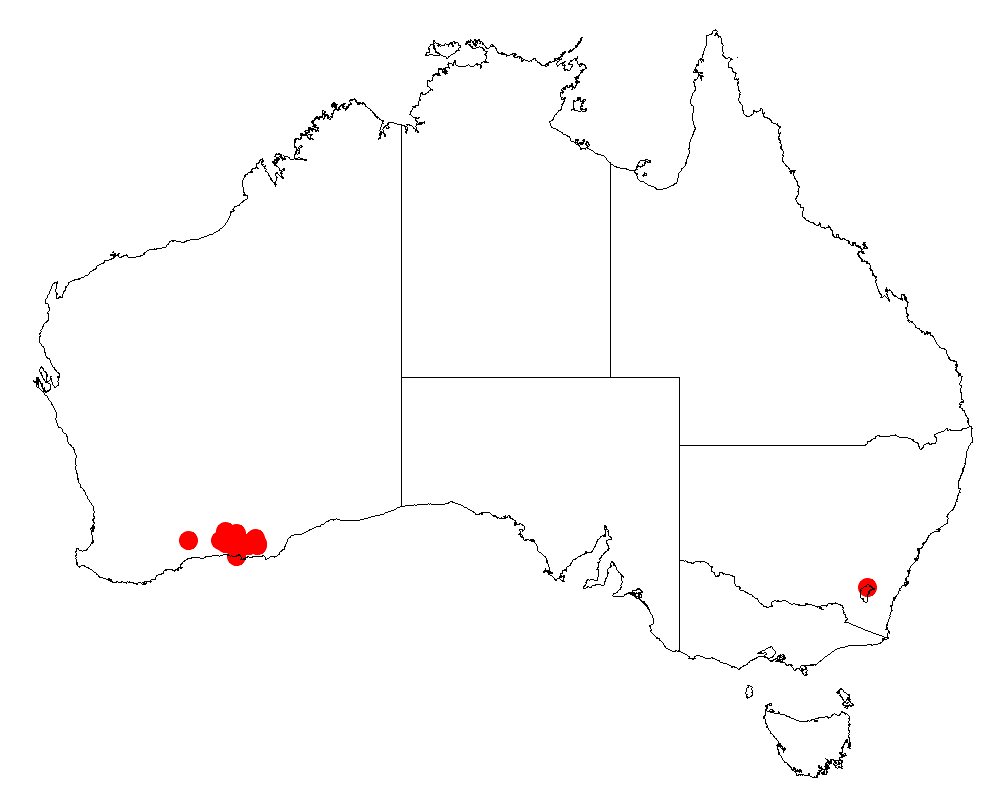
- Occurrence data from AVH

Synonyms
- Racosperma glaucissimum (Maslin) Pedley

= Acacia glaucissima =

Species of legume

Acacia glaucissima is a species of flowering plant in the family Fabaceae and is endemic to the south-west of Western Australia. It is a spreading, glabrous shrub with narrowly elliptic to oblong or lance-shaped phyllodes with the narrower end towards the base, spherical heads of golden yellow flowers and twisted to coiled black pods.

== Description ==
Acacia glaucissima is a dense, spreading, glabrous shrub that typically grows to a height of 0.5–1.5 m (1 ft 8 in – 4 ft 11 in) and has terete, more or less ribbed branchlets. Its phyllodes are narrowly elliptic to oblong or lance-shaped with the narrower end towards the base, sometimes egg-shaped or elliptic, more or less wavy or twisted, 20–40 mm (0.79–1.57 in) long and 5–15 mm (0.20–0.59 in) wide. The phyllodes have a coarse to sharp point, thickly leathery and smooth, very glaucous with the midrib and edge veins prominent and a gland mostly 3–7 mm (0.12–0.28 in) above the pulvinus. There are brittle stipules 3–4 mm (0.12–0.16 in) long at the base of the phyllodes.

The flowers are borne in two spherical heads in racemes in axils on a peduncle 10–20 mm (0.39–0.79 in) long, each head 5–6 mm (0.20–0.24 in) in diameter with 20 to 35 golden yellow flowers. The pods are irregularly twisted to loosely coiled, terete, up to 65 mm (2.6 in) long and 2–3 mm (0.079–0.118 in) wide, thinly leathery to slightly crusty and black. The seeds are oblong, 3 mm (0.12 in) long, almost bright dark brown with a conical to helmet-shaped aril.

== Taxonomy ==
Acacia glaucissima was first formally described in 1999 by Bruce Maslin in the journal Nuytsia from specimens he collected 20 km (12 mi) south of Salmon Gums near the Coolgardie-Esperance Highway in 1989. The specific epithet (glaucisima) means 'blue-tinged', referring to the phyllodes.

== Distribution and habitat ==
This species of wattle occurs from near Mount Madden (about 40 km (25 mi) north-north-west of Ravensthorpe) to near Mount Heywood (about 85 km (53 mi) north-east of Esperance), but mainly occurs between Salmon Gums and Grass Patch and east to Mount Heywood. It grows in sand or on clay flats in open woodland with low scrub or low heath in the Mallee bioregion of south-western Western Australia.

== Conservation status ==
Acacia glaucissima is listed as "not threatened" by the Government of Western Australia Department of Biodiversity, Conservation and Attractions.

== See also ==
- List of Acacia species
