= Acacia bracteolata =

Scientific classification
- Kingdom: Plantae
- Clade: Tracheophytes
- Clade: Angiosperms
- Clade: Eudicots
- Clade: Rosids
- Order: Fabales
- Family: Fabaceae
- Subfamily: Caesalpinioideae
- Clade: Mimosoid clade
- Genus: Acacia
- Species: A. bracteolata

Binomial name
- Acacia bracteolata Maslin
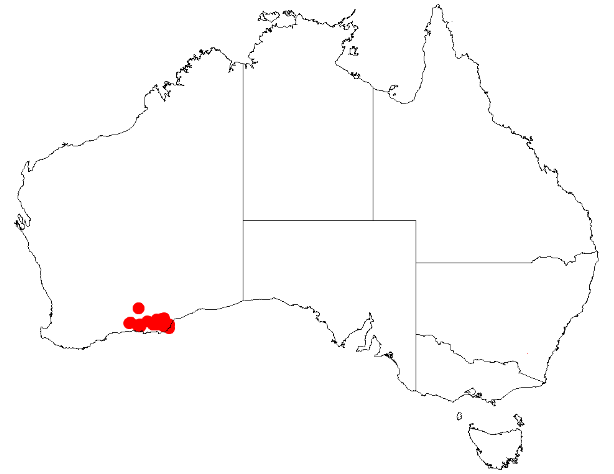
- Occurrence data from AVH

Synonyms
- Racosperma bracteolatum (Maslin) Pedley

Species of legume

Acacia bracteolata is a species of flowering plant in the family Fabaceae and is endemic to the south of Western Australia. It is a spreading shrub with narrowly elliptic or lance-shaped phyllodes with the narrower end towards the base, spherical or slightly oblong heads of lemon yellow flowers, and curved, firmly papery pods.

== Description ==
Acacia bracteolata is spreading shrub that typically grows to a height of 30–70 cm (12–28 in). The branchlets are covered with soft or shaggy hairs. The phyllodes are elliptic or lance-shaped with the narrower end towards the base, mostly 15–25 mm (0.59–0.98 in) long and 5–10 mm (0.20–0.39 in) wide with thin, membranous stipules 3–4 mm (0.12–0.16 in) long at the base. The flowers are usually borne in two spherical to slightly oblong heads, in axils on peduncles 4–6 mm (0.16–0.24 in) long. Each head is 4.5–5.5 mm (0.18–0.22 in) in diameter with 19 to 25 lemon yellow flowers. Flowering has been observed between July and September, and the pods are curved, firmly papery, up to 60 mm (2.4 in) long and 5–7 mm (0.20–0.28 in) wide containing dull black seeds about 4 mm (0.16 in) long with a cream-coloured, club-shaped aril.

== Taxonomy ==
Acacia bracteolata was first formally described in 1999 by Bruce Maslin in the journal Nuytsia from specimens collected near Scaddan in 1984. The specific epithet (bracteolata) means bracteolate, referring to the protruding bracteoles of the flower heads.

== Distribution and habitat ==
This species of wattle grows in sand or calcareous loam in mallee, sometimes near salt lakes between the northern end of Cape Arid National Park and 50 km (31 mi) west of Grass Patch in the Coolgardie and Mallee bioregions of south-western Western Australia.

== Conservation status ==
Acacia bracteolata is listed as "not threatened" by the Government of Western Australia Department of Biodiversity, Conservation and Attractions.

== See also ==
- List of Acacia species
