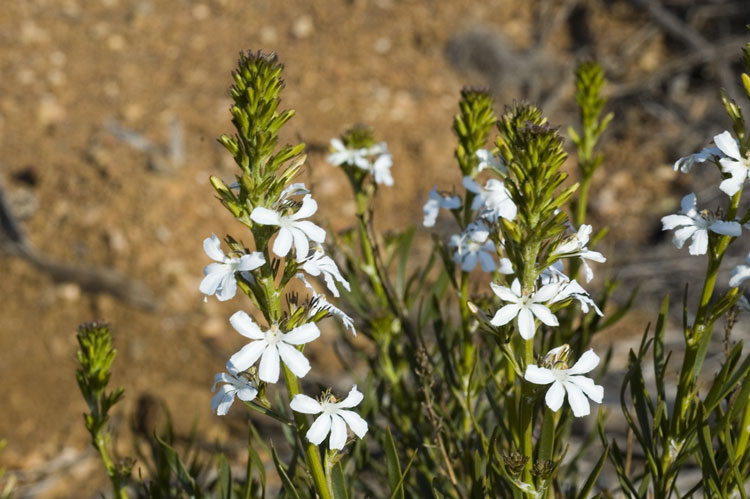
- Goodenia scapigera near Ravensthorpe

Scientific classification
- Kingdom: Plantae
- Clade: Tracheophytes
- Clade: Angiosperms
- Clade: Eudicots
- Clade: Asterids
- Order: Asterales
- Family: Goodeniaceae
- Genus: Goodenia
- Species: G. scapigera

Binomial name
- Goodenia scapigera R.Br.

Synonyms
- Goodenia scapigera var. parviflora Benth.; Goodenia scapigera R.Br. var. scapigera; Scaevola stricta de Vriese; Stekhovia scapigera (R.Br.) de Vriese

= Goodenia scapigera =

White goodenia

Species of plant

Goodenia scapigera, commonly known as white goodenia, is a species of flowering plant in the family Goodeniaceae and is endemic to the south-west of Western Australia. It is an erect, perennial herb or shrub with linear to narrow egg-shaped leaves clustered near the ends of the stems, and thyrses of white flowers with purplish spots.

== Description ==
Goodenia scapigera is an erect, perennial herb or shrub that typically grows to a height of 0.3–1.5 m (1 ft 0 in – 4 ft 11 in) and is glabrous. The leaves are linear to narrow egg-shaped with the narrower end towards the base, more or less clustered at the ends of the stems, 40–60 mm (1.6–2.4 in) long and 2–10 mm (0.079–0.394 in) wide, sometimes with toothed edges. The flowers are arranged in thyrses up to 200 mm (7.9 in) long, with linear bracts about 5 mm (0.20 in) long and linear bracteoles about 2 mm (0.079 in) long. Each flower is on a pedicel 1–3 mm (0.039–0.118 in) long with linear to triangular sepals 7–8 mm (0.28–0.31 in) long. The petals are white with purplish spots near the base, 8–18 mm (0.31–0.71 in) long, the lower lobes of the corolla 7–11 mm (0.28–0.43 in) long with wings about 1 mm (0.039 in) wide. Flowering mainly occurs from September to January and the fruit is an oval to elliptical capsule 5–7 mm (0.20–0.28 in) long.

== Taxonomy and naming ==
Goodenia scapigera was first formally described in 1810 by Robert Brown in his Prodromus Florae Novae Hollandiae et Insulae Van Diemen. The specific epithet (scapigera) means "bearing a flower stalk".

In 2000, Leigh William Sage described two subspecies and the names are accepted by the Australian Plant Census:

- Goodenia scapigera subsp. graniticola L.W.Sage differs from the autonym in having leaves that are in clusters, linear, not toothed, and up to 2 mm (0.079 in) wide;
- Goodenia scapigera R.Br. subsp. scapigera L.W.Sage (the autonym) has leaves not clustered, linear to narrow egg-shaped, sometimes toothed and 2–10 mm (0.079–0.394 in) wide.

== Distribution and habitat ==
This goodenia usually grows in sandy soil in woodland or heath and is widespread in the Avon Wheatbelt, Coolgardie, Esperance Plains, Jarrah Forest, Mallee and Swan Coastal Plain biogeographic regions in the south west of Western Australia. Subspecies graniticola has a more restricted distribution, growing in heath in granitic soil near Peak Charles National Park.

== Conservation status ==
Goodenia scapigera subsp. scapigera is classified as "not threatened" by the Western Australian Government Department of Parks and Wildlife, but subsp. graniticola is classified as "Priority Two" by the Western Australian Government Department of Parks and Wildlife meaning that it is poorly known and from only one or a few locations.
