= Pterostylis elegantissima =

Elegant rufous greenhood

Conservation status
- Priority One — Poorly Known Taxa (DEC)

Scientific classification
- Kingdom: Plantae
- Clade: Tracheophytes
- Clade: Angiosperms
- Clade: Monocots
- Order: Asparagales
- Family: Orchidaceae
- Subfamily: Orchidoideae
- Tribe: Cranichideae
- Genus: Pterostylis
- Species: P. elegantissima

Binomial name
- Pterostylis elegantissima (D.L.Jones & C.J.French) D.L.Jones

Synonyms
- Oligochaetochilus elegantissimus D.L.Jones & C.J.French

Species of orchid

Pterostylis elegantissima, commonly known as the elegant rufous greenhood, is a species of orchid endemic to the south-west of Western Australia. Both flowering and non-flowering plants have a large rosette of leaves flat on the ground and flowering plants have up to eight green, white and black or brown flowers.

== Description ==
Pterostylis elegantissima is a terrestrial, perennial, deciduous, herb with an underground tuber and a rosette of leaves 20–60 mm (0.8–2 in) in diameter. Flowering plants have up to eight, well-spaced flowers 30–35 mm (1.2–1.4 in) long and 10–12 mm (0.4–0.5 in) wide on a flowering stem 150–450 mm (6–20 in) high. The flowers are green, white and black or brown. The dorsal sepal and petals are fused, forming a hood or "galea" over the column. The lateral sepals turn downwards and suddenly taper to thread-like tips which spread apart from each other. The labellum is dark blackish-brown and insect-like with many short hairs on the "head" end and longer bristles on the side of the "body". Flowering occurs from October to November.

== Taxonomy and naming ==
The elegant rufous greenhood was first formally described in 2014 by David Jones and Christopher French and given the name Oligochaetochilus elegantissimus. The description was published in Australian Orchid Review from a specimen collected near the Peak Charles National Park. In 2015 David Jones changed the name to Pterostylis elegantissima "to allow for the different taxonomic views held at generic level within the subtribe". The species had previously been known as Pterostylis sp. 'elegant'. The specific epithet (elegantissima) is the superlative form of the Latin word elegans meaning "tasteful", "choice", "fine" or "select", hence "most elegant" "in reference to the tall habit of the plant and its elegant, decorative flowers".

== Distribution and habitat ==
The elegant rufous greenhood grows in woodland and in shallow soil on granite outcrops. It has a wide distribution between Goomalling and Salmon Gums in the Mallee biogeographic region but only occurs in a few isolated populations.

== Conservation ==
Pterostylis elegantissima is classified as "Priority One" by the Western Australian Government Department of Parks and Wildlife, meaning that it is known from only one or a few locations which are potentially at risk.
