= Acacia warramaba =

Scientific classification
- Kingdom: Plantae
- Clade: Embryophytes
- Clade: Tracheophytes
- Clade: Angiosperms
- Clade: Eudicots
- Clade: Rosids
- Order: Fabales
- Family: Fabaceae
- Subfamily: Caesalpinioideae
- Clade: Mimosoid clade
- Genus: Acacia
- Species: A. warramaba

Binomial name
- Acacia warramaba Maslin
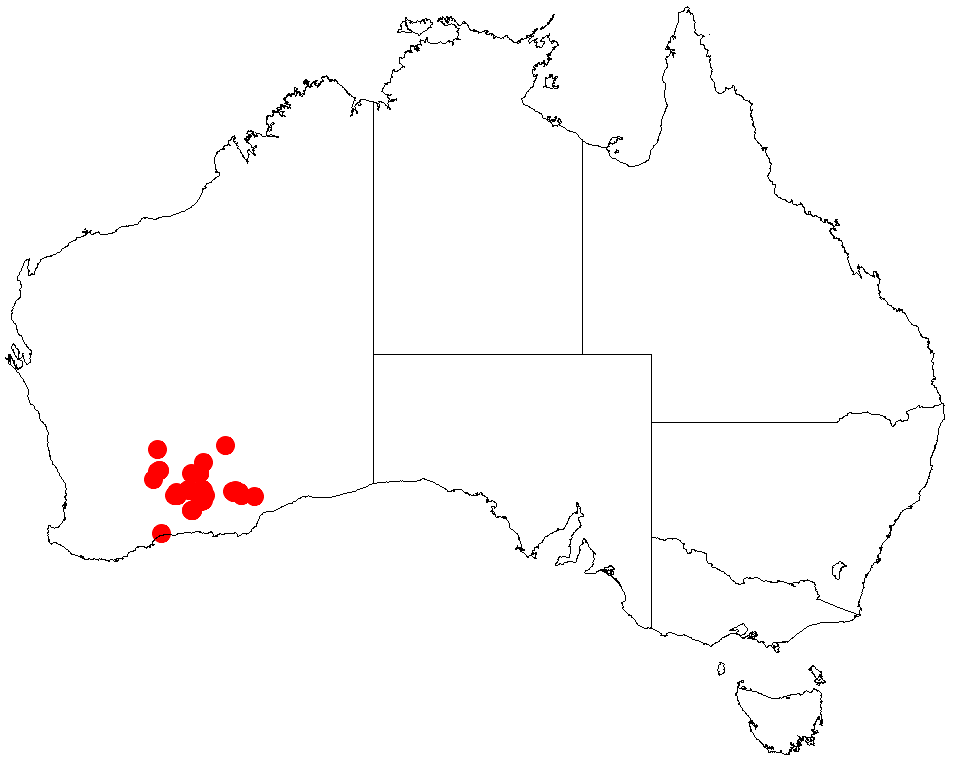
- Occurrence data from AVH

Species of legume

Acacia warramaba is a shrub of the genus Acacia and the subgenus Plurinerves that is endemic to an area of south western Australia.

== Description ==
The bushy shrub typically grows to a height of 1 to 3.5 metres (3 to 11 ft) and has a rounded or obconic habit with stems that are not fluted and glabrous branchlets. Like most species of Acacia it has phyllodes rather than true leaves. The glabrous, ascending to erect phyllodes have a linear to narrowly elliptic or oblanceolate shape and are more or less straight with a length of 3 to 10 cm (1.2 to 3.9 in) in length and a width of 3 to 10 mm (0.12 to 0.39 in) with many closely parallel nerves with the middle one being a little more pronounced than the others. It blooms from November to February and produces yellow flowers. The inflorescences are found in group of two to four on racemes with an axis with a length of 2 to 5 mm (0.079 to 0.197 in) with spherical flower-heads globular with a diameter of 3.5 to 4 mm (0.14 to 0.16 in) containing over 45 golden coloured flowers. The chartaceous red=brown seed pods that form after flowering have a narrowly oblong shape and are slightly raised over the seeds with a length of up to 7 cm (2.8 in) and a width of 5 to 8 mm (0.20 to 0.31 in). The pods contain shiny brown seeds with an elliptic or oblong-elliptic shape with a length of 3 to 4.5 mm (0.12 to 0.18 in).

== Distribution ==
It is native to an area in the Goldfields-Esperance region of Western Australia where it is commonly situated on low rocky rises and in low-lying areas growing in stony clay, loam or sandy soils. It has a scattered distribution with a range that extends from Southern Cross in the west to around Kambalda in the east and to around Peak Charles National Park in the south in hilly country as a part of shrubland or mallee woodland communities.

== See also ==
- List of Acacia species
