= Acacia quinquenervia =

Scientific classification
- Kingdom: Plantae
- Clade: Tracheophytes
- Clade: Angiosperms
- Clade: Eudicots
- Clade: Rosids
- Order: Fabales
- Family: Fabaceae
- Subfamily: Caesalpinioideae
- Clade: Mimosoid clade
- Genus: Acacia
- Species: A. quinquenervia

Binomial name
- Acacia quinquenervia Maslin
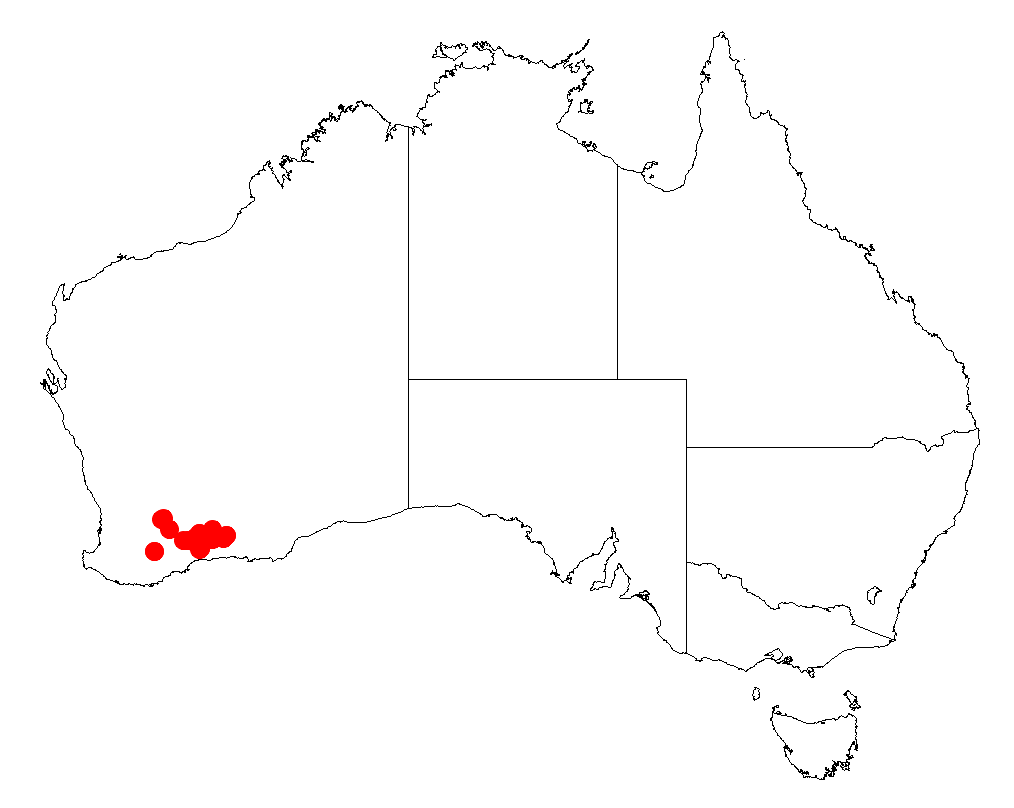
- Occurrence data from AVH

Species of legume

Acacia quinquenervia is a shrub of the genus Acacia and the subgenus Phyllodineae that is endemic to south western Australia

== Description ==
The shrub typically grows to a height of 0.2 to 1.5 metres (0.7 to 4.9 ft) with peeling and fibrous bark. The branchelts are usually densely haired and like most species of Acacia it has phyllodes rather than true leaves. The green to grey-green phyllodes are flat with a narrowly linear shape with a length of 2 to 7 cm (0.79 to 2.76 in) and a width of 1 to 2 mm (0.039 to 0.079 in) with five noticeable nerves. The rudimentary inflorescences appear on two branched racemes with spherical flower-heads that have a diameter of 3.5 to 4 mm (0.14 to 0.16 in) and contain 15 to 20 light golden coloured flowers. The linear and biconvex seed pods that form after flowering are shallowly curved and have a length up to around 5.5 cm (2.2 in) and a width of 1.5 to 3 m (4 ft 11 in to 9 ft 10 in). The thinly coriaceous-crustaceous seed pods are glabrous to moderately hairy with longitudinally arranged seeds inside. The mottled seeds have an oblong shape with a length of 2.5 to 3 mm (0.098 to 0.118 in) and a terminal conical shaped aril.

== Taxonomy ==
The species was first formally described by the botanist Bruce Maslin in 1999 as part of the work Acacia miscellany. The taxonomy of fifty-five species of Acacia, primarily Western Australian, in section Phyllodineae (Leguminosae: Mimosoideae) as published in the journal Nuytsia. It was reclassified as Racosperma quinquenervium by Leslie Pedley in 2003 then transferred back to genus Acacia in 2006. The specific epithet (quinquenervia) is from the Latin quinque meaning "five" and nervus, "vein", referring to the leaves usually having five veins.

== Distribution ==
It is native to an area in the Wheatbelt and Goldfields-Esperance regions of Western Australia where it is commonly situated on flats and undulating plains growing in sandy, clay or loamy soils. It has a scattered distribution from around Nyabing in the south west to around Peak Charles National Park in the north east where it is usually a part of low Eucalyptus woodlands or open mallee shrubland communities.

== See also ==
- List of Acacia species
