= Acacia improcera =

Conservation status
- Priority Three — Poorly Known Taxa (DEC)

Scientific classification
- Kingdom: Plantae
- Clade: Embryophytes
- Clade: Tracheophytes
- Clade: Spermatophytes
- Clade: Angiosperms
- Clade: Eudicots
- Clade: Rosids
- Order: Fabales
- Family: Fabaceae
- Subfamily: Caesalpinioideae
- Clade: Mimosoid clade
- Genus: Acacia
- Species: A. improcera

Binomial name
- Acacia improcera Maslin

Synonyms
- Racosperma improcerum (Maslin) Pedley

Species of legume

Acacia improcera is a species of flowering plant in the family Fabaceae and is endemic to the south-west of Western Australia. It is a spreading, spiny shrub with ribbed branches, obliquely egg-shaped to elliptic phyllodes, spherical heads of light golden yellow flowers, and rounded, firmly papery to thinly leathery pods.

== Description ==
Acacia improcera is a spreading, spiny shrub that typically grows to a height of 15–40 cm (5.9–15.7 in) high and has striated and finely ribbed branches, waxy white between the ribs and covered with minute, rigid, soft hairs. Its phyllodes are obliquely egg-shaped, 3–6 mm (0.12–0.24 in) long and 1.5–3.5 mm (0.059–0.138 in) wide with a scarcely prominent midrib and few or no lateral veins. The flowers are borne in a spherical head in axils on a glabrous peduncle 2.5–4 mm (0.098–0.157 in) long, with nine to eleven light golden yellow flowers. Flowering occurs in August and the pods are rounded over the seeds and variably constricted between them, curved, up to 30 mm (1.2 in) long and 4 mm (0.16 in) wide and firmly papery to thinly leathery. The seeds are widely egg-shaped, 3 mm (0.12 in) long and mostly shiny dark brown with an aril about 3/4 the length of the seed.

== Taxonomy ==
Acacia improcera was first formally described in 1999 by Bruce Maslin in the journal Nuytsia from specimens he collected 50 km (31 mi) east-north-east of Grass Patch in 1985. The specific epithet (improcera) is derived from Latin word meaning 'very tall' with the prefix 'contrary', referring to the plant's small stature.

== Distribution and habitat ==
This species of wattle grows in clay, rocky loam or sand in the zone between heath and scrub mallee, from Lake King to the Bremer Range (about 105 km (65 mi) west-south-west of Norseman), through Frank Hann National Park, and near Ravensthorpe and Sheoak Hill (about 80 km (50 mi) north-east of Esperance) in the Coolgardie, Esperance Plains and Mallee bioregions in the south-west of Western Australia.

== Conservation status ==
Acacia improcera is listed as "Priority Three" by the Government of Western Australia Department of Biodiversity, Conservation and Attractions, meaning that it is poorly known and known from only a few locations but is not under imminent threat.

== See also ==
- List of Acacia species
