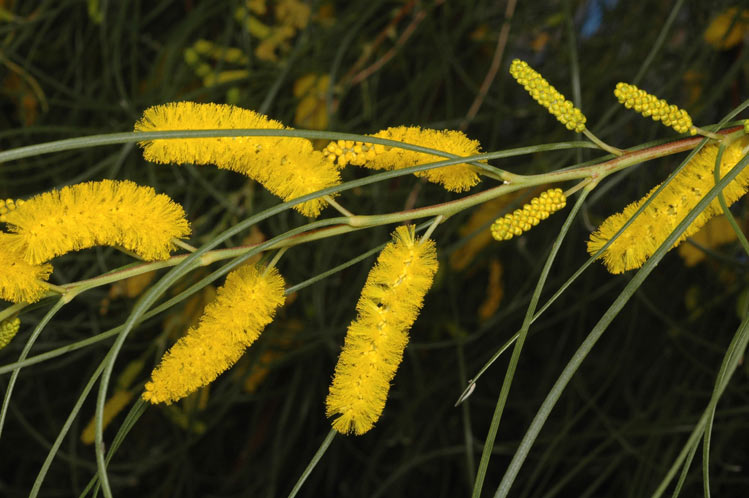
- In the Australian National Botanic Gardens

Scientific classification
- Kingdom: Plantae
- Clade: Embryophytes
- Clade: Tracheophytes
- Clade: Spermatophytes
- Clade: Angiosperms
- Clade: Eudicots
- Clade: Rosids
- Order: Fabales
- Family: Fabaceae
- Subfamily: Caesalpinioideae
- Clade: Mimosoid clade
- Genus: Acacia
- Species: A. jibberdingensis

Binomial name
- Acacia jibberdingensis Maiden & Blakely
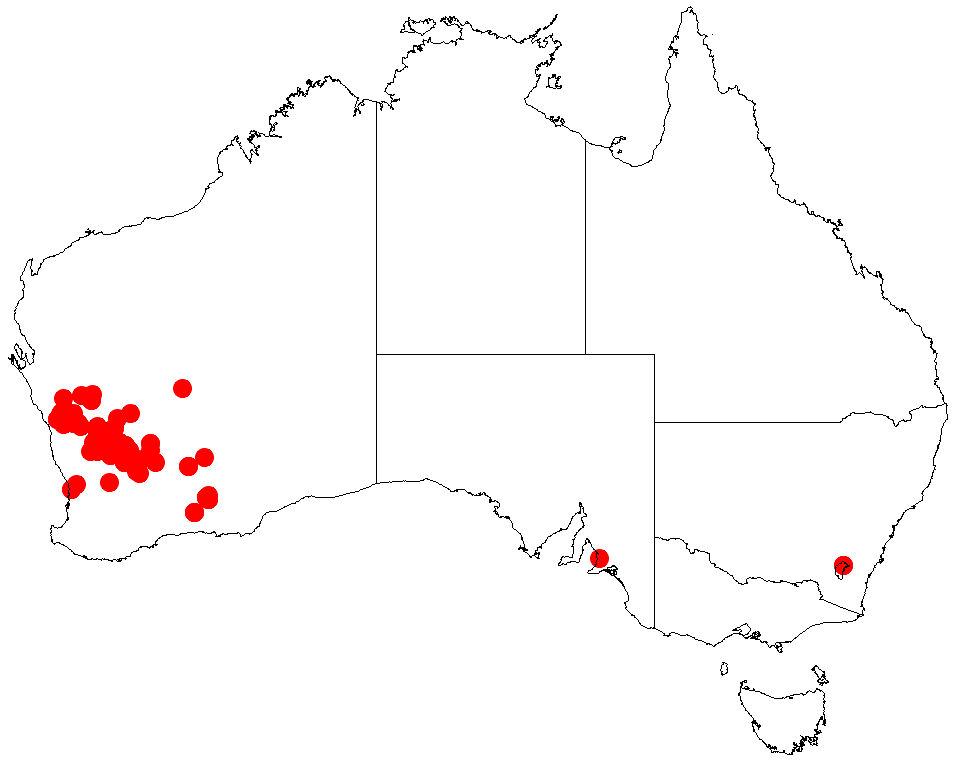
- Occurrence data from AVH

Synonyms
- Racosperma jibberdingense (Maiden & Blakely) Pedley

= Acacia jibberdingensis =

Jibberding wattle

Species of legume

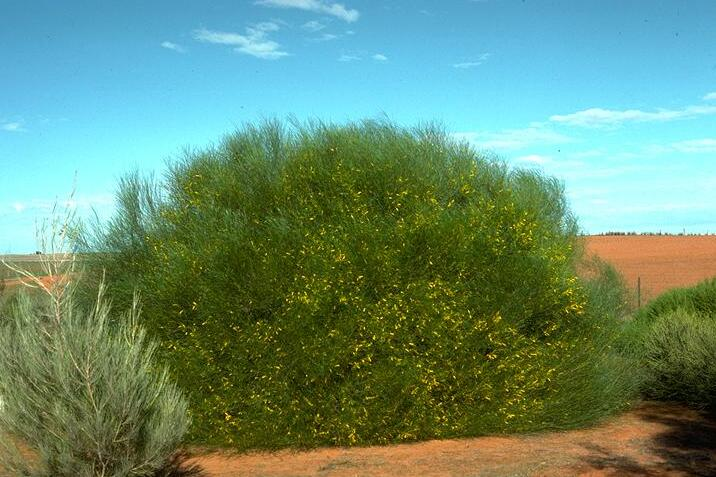
In Wilga Park, Swan Hill

Acacia jibberdingensis, also known as Jibberding wattle or willow-leafed wattle, is a species of flowering plant in the family Fabaceae and is endemic to the south-west of Western Australia. It is a usually a shrub or small tree with linear, straight to slightly curved, flat to terete phyllodes, spikes of golden yellow flowers and glabrous, thinly leathery pods, more or less resembling a string of beads.

== Description ==
Acacia jibberdingensis is usually a shrub or small tree that typically grows to 1.5–7 m (4 ft 11 in – 23 ft 0 in) high, about 5 m (16 ft) wide and has angled branchlets covered with soft hairs pressed against the surface. Its phyllodes are horizontal to ascending. linear, straight to slightly curved, flat to terete, 150–320 mm (5.9–12.6 in) long, 1.0–1.5 mm (0.039–0.059 in) wide and more or less glabrous with up to eight prominent veins. The flowers are golden yellow and usually arranged in a spike 20–35 mm (0.79–1.38 in) long and 6 mm (0.24 in) in diameter in axils, on a peduncle 6–11 mm (0.24–0.43 in) long. Flowering occurs from June to October and the pods are up to 210 mm (8.3 in) long and 5–7 mm (0.20–0.28 in) wide, glabrous and thinly leathery, appearing somewhat like a string of beads. The seeds are broadly elliptic, 4.5–5.5 mm (0.18–0.22 in) long and glossy black.

== Taxonomy ==
Acacia jibberdingensis was first formally described in 1927 by Joseph Maiden and William Blakely in the Journal of the Royal Society of Western Australia from specimens collected by Max Koch east of the 120-mile peg near Jibberding, north of Cunderdin, on the East Goldfield Railway in 1906. The specific epithet (jibberdingensis) means 'native of Jibberding'.

== Distribution and habitat ==
Jibberding wattle has a scattered distribution from Mullewa and Jingemarra Station to Peak Charles National Park, with a single collection about 350 km (220 mi) east of Jingemarra Station, in the Avon Wheatbelt, Coolgardie, Geraldton Sandplains, Mallee, Murchison, Swan Coastal Plain and Yalgoo bioregions of south-western Western Australia. It mostly grows in loamy sand near granite outcrops in scrub and shrubland.

== Conservation status ==
Acacia jibberdingensis is listed as 'not threatened' by the Government of Western Australia Department of Biodiversity, Conservation and Attractions.

== Use in horticulture ==
It is available for cultivation in seed form but the seeds must be scarified prior to planting. It grows best in well-drained soils in a sunny position and is both frost and drought tolerant.

== See also ==
- List of Acacia species
