= Continental Stress Class =

Continental Stress Class is a method of describing the landscape health of biogeographic regions in Australia. There are six Continental Stress Classes with Class 1 containing the most stressed regions and Class 6 the least stressed and therefore most healthy. The classification takes into account indicators of landscape health such as the extent, condition, connectivity, and rate of clearing of native vegetation; changes to soil and hydrological conditions; the presence of feral plants and animals; the presence of threatened species and ecological communities; and threats such as dryland salinity; and fire regime.

Continental Stress Classes were first introduced by Gethin Morgan in 2001, in the report Landscape Health In Australia: A rapid assessment of the relative condition of Australia's bioregions and subregions. Morgan gave a class to each of the Interim Biogeographic Regionalisation for Australia (IBRA) subregions, as follows:

- Class One: 17 subregions, including the Avon Wheatbelt, the Tasmanian Midlands and numerous subregions in south eastern Australia, including most of Victoria;
- Class Two: 20 subregions;
- Class Three: 90 subregions;
- Class Four: 75 subregions;
- Classes Five and Six: 152 subregions.

The classification is now used by a range of federal and state government agencies in Australia.
