= Conostylis lepidospermoides =

Conservation status
- Declared rare (DEC)

Scientific classification
- Kingdom: Plantae
- Clade: Tracheophytes
- Clade: Angiosperms
- Clade: Monocots
- Clade: Commelinids
- Order: Commelinales
- Family: Haemodoraceae
- Genus: Conostylis
- Species: C. lepidospermoides

Binomial name
- Conostylis lepidospermoides Hopper

Species of flowering plant

Conostylis lepidospermoides, commonly known as sedge conostylis, is a rhizomatous, tufted perennial, grass-like plant or herb in the family Haemodoraceae and is endemic to the south-west of Western Australia. It has flat, yellowish-green, glabrous leaves, and lemon-yellow, tubular flowers.

== Description ==
Conostylis lepidospermoides is a rhizomatous, tufted, perennial, grass-like plant or herb. It has flat leaves 170–360 mm (6.7–14.2 in) long, 1.0–1.6 mm (0.039–0.063 in) wide and glabrous, apart from bristles or hairs on the leaf margins. The flowers are borne in a loose cyme on a flowering stem 10–40 mm (0.39–1.57 in) tall with up to 6 flowers and a bract 5–21 mm (0.20–0.83 in) long at the base, each flower 13–18 mm (0.51–0.71 in) long on a pedicel 6–8 mm (0.24–0.31 in) long. The perianth is lemon-yellow and hairy, with lobes 6–10 mm (0.24–0.39 in) long, the anthers 4.0–5.5 mm (0.16–0.22 in) long and the style 9.5–11.5 mm (0.37–0.45 in) long. Flowering occurs in late September and October. It is inconspicuous when not in flower, but has some of the largest flowers in the genus.

== Taxonomy and naming ==
Conostylis lepidospermoides was first formally described in 1987 by Stephen Hopper in the Flora of Australia, from specimens he collected 24 km (15 mi) north-east of Munglinup in 1978. The specific epithet (lepidospermoides) means "Lepidosperma-like", referring to the leaves.

== Distribution and habitat ==
This conostylis grows in sandy soils over laterite on road verges near cleared farmland, from near Ravensthorpe to the 90-mile Tank on the Norseman-Lake King Road, in the Esperance Plains and Mallee bioregions of south-western Western Australia.

== Conservation status ==
Conostylis lepidospermoides is listed as "Threatened" by the Western Australian Government Department of Biodiversity, Conservation and Attractions, meaning that it is in danger of extinction.
