= Red Lake, Western Australia =

Former town in the Shire of Esperance, Western Australia

Red Lake
- Town
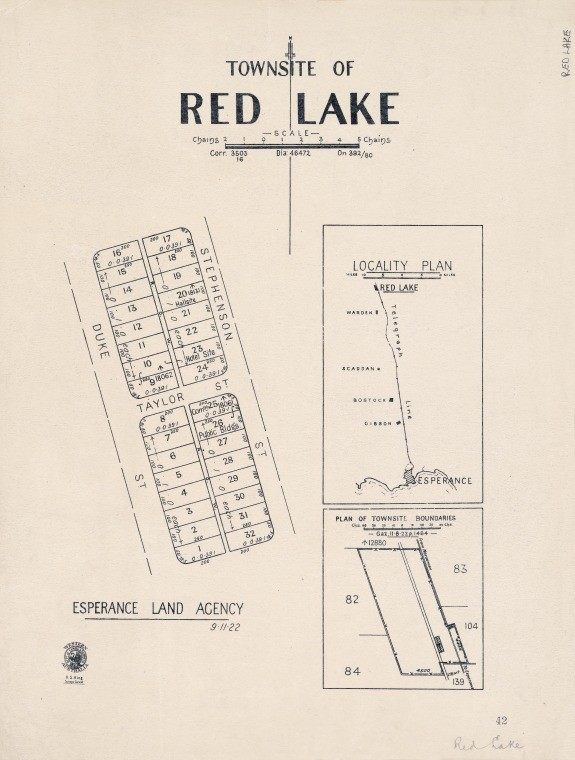
- A 1922 map of the townsite of Red Lake

- Interactive map of Red Lake
- Coordinates: 33.14942°S 121.70917°E
- Country: Australia
- State: Western Australia
- LGA: Shire of Esperance
- Location: 564 km (350 mi) E of Perth; 105 km (65 mi) S of Norseman; 82 km (51 mi) N of Esperance
- Established: 1922

Government
  - State electorate: Roe
  - Federal division: O'Connor

Area
  - Total: 1.39 km^{2} (0.54 sq mi)
- Postcode: 6446

Red Lake is an abandoned town in the Shire of Esperance in the Goldfields-Esperance region of Western Australia. It is situated within the locality of Grass Patch, on the Coolgardie-Esperance Highway.

The townsite is on the traditional land of the Kalaako people, who are also referred to as the Malba or Malpa, a name given to them by the Wudjari people to the south.

Originally selected as a siding on the Norseman to Esperance railway in 1916, Red Lake was gazetted as a townsite in 1922. An official 1922 map of the townsite shows the town west of the telegraph line and consisted of the north-south running Stephenson and Duke Streets and the east-west running Taylor Street, with 32 blocks of land allocated along them.

The Red Lake Townsite Nature Reserve, gazetted on 14 March 1969 with a size of 0.76 square kilometres (0.29 mi^{2}), now occupies the western part of the townsite. It is located in the Mallee bioregion.
