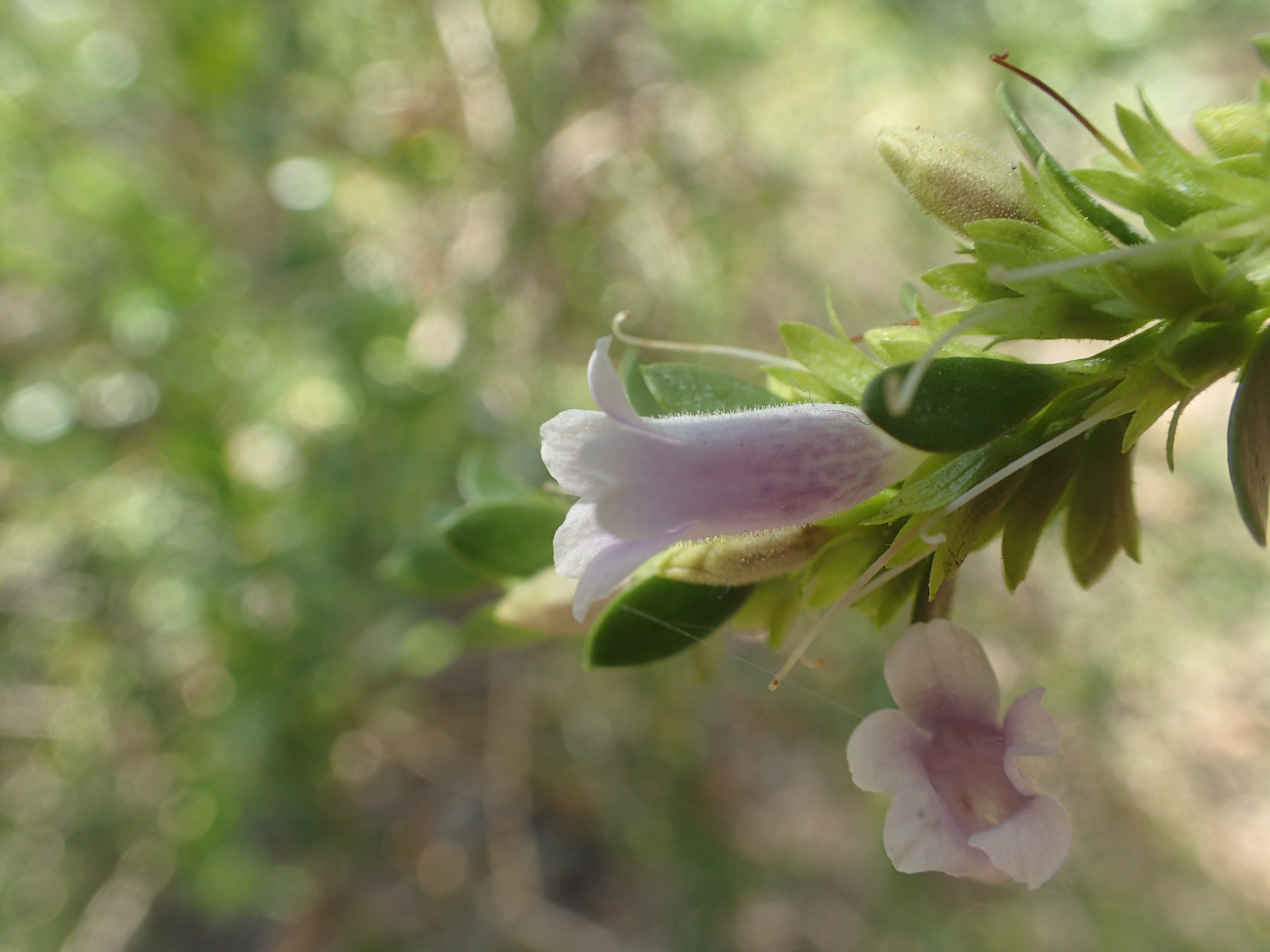
- Eremophila lactea in Kings Park, Western Australia

Conservation status
- Declared rare (DEC)

Scientific classification
- Kingdom: Plantae
- Clade: Tracheophytes
- Clade: Angiosperms
- Clade: Eudicots
- Clade: Asterids
- Order: Lamiales
- Family: Scrophulariaceae
- Genus: Eremophila
- Species: E. lactea

Binomial name
- Eremophila lactea Chinnock

= Eremophila lactea =

Milky emu bush

Species of flowering plant

Eremophila lactea, commonly known as milky emu bush, is a flowering plant in the figwort family, Scrophulariaceae and is endemic to Western Australia. It is an erect shrub with its branches and leaves mostly glabrous but with white blotches due to the presence of dry resin. It is a critically endangered plant species mostly found in disturbed areas such as roadsides.

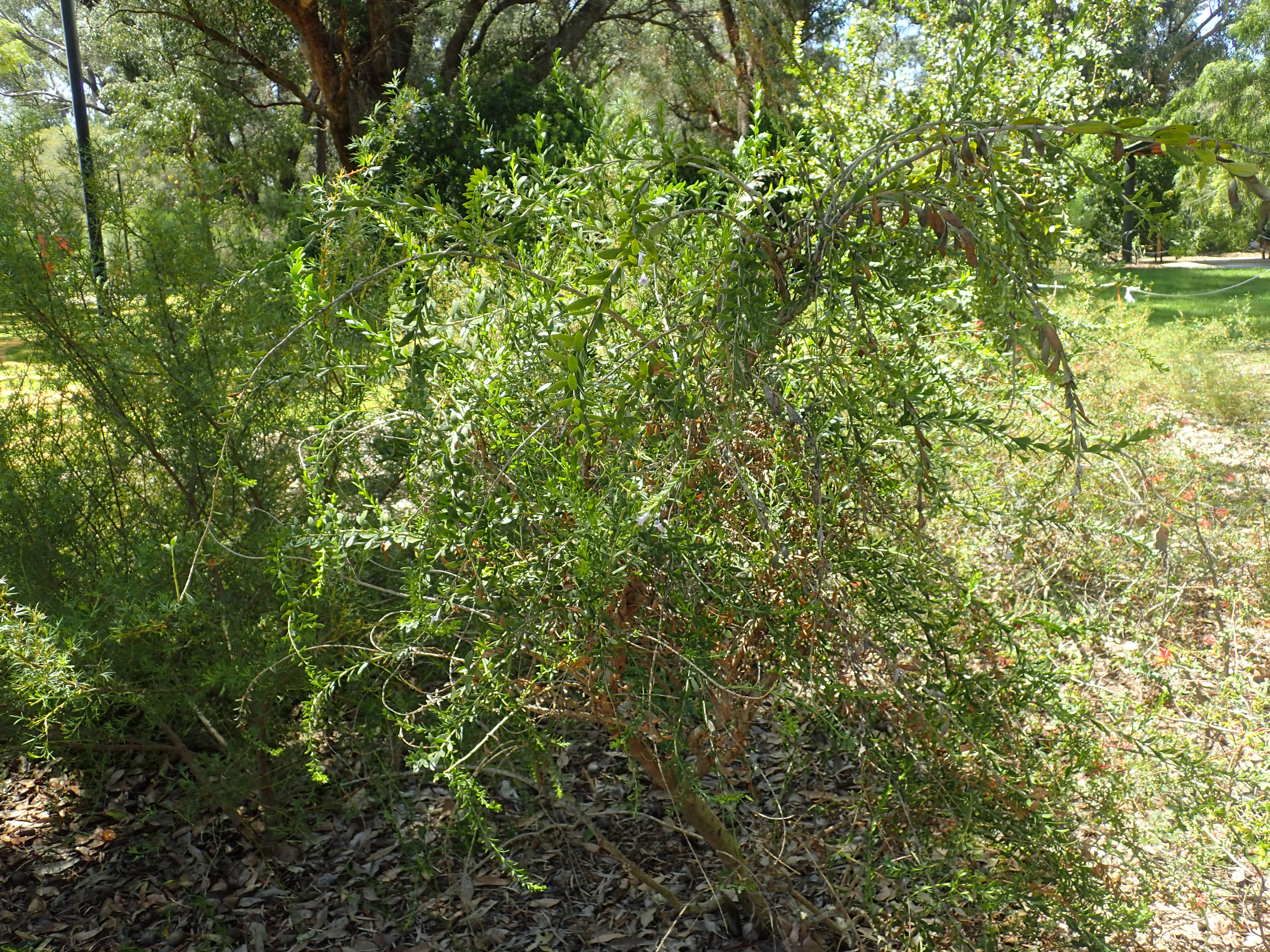
Habit in Kings Park

== Description ==
Eremophila lactea is an erect shrub usually growing to a height of between 1 and 3.5 m (3 and 10 ft). Its branches are mostly glabrous and have prominent white blotches due to the presence of dried resin. The stalkless, overlapping leaves are 10–31 mm (0.4–1 in) long, 2–6 mm (0.08–0.2 in) wide, elliptic to lance-shaped and often hide the branchlets. The leaves are often blotched like the branches with dried resin.

The flowers are borne in groups of 3 or 4 in leaf axils on stalks 2–3 mm (0.08–0.1 in) long which often have white blotches. There are 5 green, oblong to lance-shaped sepals which are mostly 3–5.5 mm (0.1–0.2 in) long. The petals are 8–13.5 mm (0.3–0.5 in) long and are joined at their lower end to form a tube. The tube is pale lilac on the outside and a deeper lilac inside with light purple spots in the tube. The outside of the petal tube is densely covered with glandular hairs but the inside surface of the petal lobes is glabrous while the inside of the tube is filled with long, soft hairs. The 4 stamens are fully enclosed in the petal tube. Flowering occurs between September and November in its native range and the fruits which follow are ovoid to cylindrical and up to 3.5 mm (0.1 in) long.

== Taxonomy and naming ==
Eremophila lactea was first formally described by botanist Robert Chinnock in the journal Nuytsia in 1985. The specific epithet (lactea) is derived from the "Latin lactea, milky; referring to the extruded white resin on the branches, leaves and pedicels".

== Distribution and habitat ==
The total known wild population in 1999 was 547 plants, growing in four roadside locations to the north of Esperance in the Mallee biogeographic region. It often grows in disturbed areas preferring sandy clay-loam. The species was declared "Rare Flora" under the Wildlife Conservation Act in 1996 and "Critically Endangered" in 1998. Threats to the population include road maintenance activities, fire, and the illegal taking of cuttings.

== Conservation status ==
This species is classified as "Threatened Flora (Declared Rare Flora — Extant)" by the Department of Environment and Conservation (Western Australia) and an Interim Recovery Plan has been prepared.

== Use in horticulture ==
Milky emu bush is a useful "filler" plant as it can be damaged by wind. It can be propagated from cuttings with difficulty but can also be grafted onto Myoporum rootstock. Plants grown on their own roots will grow in alkaline soils, including heavy clay, in full sun or partial shade. The shrub is both frost and drought tolerant.
