= Dowak, Western Australia =

Former town in the Shire of Esperance, Western Australia

Dowak
- Town
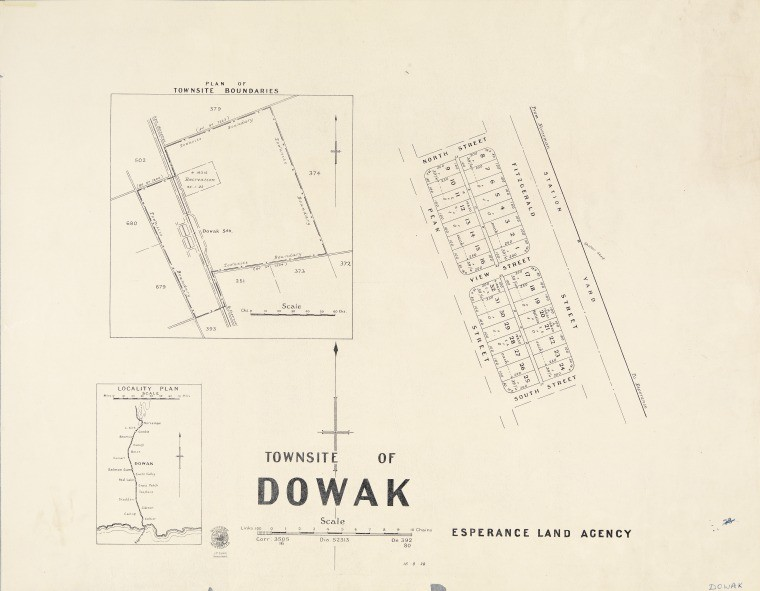
- A 1928 map of the townsite of Dowak

- Interactive map of Dowak
- Coordinates: 32.88736°S 121.60165°E
- Country: Australia
- State: Western Australia
- LGA: Shire of Esperance
- Location: 549 km (341 mi) E of Perth; 80 km (50 mi) S of Norseman; 110 km (68 mi) N of Esperance
- Established: 1928

Government
  - State electorate: Roe
  - Federal division: O'Connor

Area
  - Total: 3.38 km^{2} (1.31 sq mi)
- Postcode: 6445

Dowak is an abandoned town in the Shire of Esperance in the Goldfields-Esperance region of Western Australia. It is situated within the locality of Salmon Gums, on the Coolgardie-Esperance Highway.

The townsite is on the traditional land of the Kalaako people, who are also referred to as the Malba or Malpa, a name given to them by the Wudjari people to the south.

Originally selected as a siding on the Norseman to Esperance railway in 1926, Dowak was gazetted as a townsite in 1928. Dowak is a Noongar word for the waddy, a hardwood club or hunting stick. An official 1928 map of the townsite shows the town to include the area within the current boundaries and the neighbouring nature reserve. The town itself was located west of the railway line and consisted of the north–south running Fitzgerald and Peak Streets and the east–west running North, View and South Streets, with 32 blocks of land allocated along them.

The Dowak Nature Reserve, gazetted on 24 April 1980 with a size of 0.81 square kilometres (0.31 mi^{2}), is located in the Mallee bioregion. It is located to the west of the Coolgardie-Esperance Highway while the townsite is to the east, opposite the nature reserve.
