= Peak Charles National Park =

National park in Western Australia

- IUCN category II (national park)
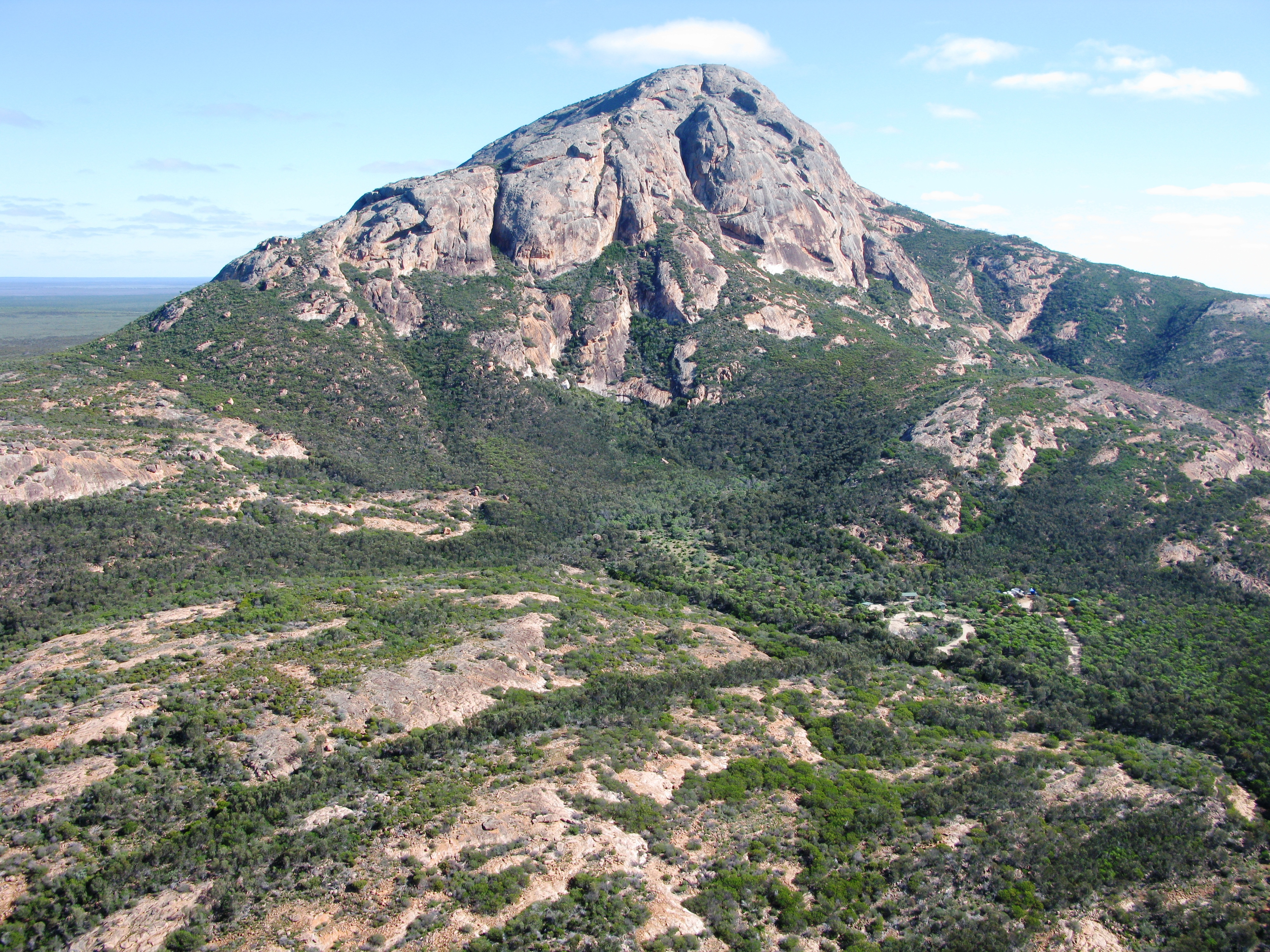
- Peak Charles seen from its eastern side

- Location within Western Australia
- Location: Western Australia
- Nearest city: Esperance
- Coordinates: 32°54′35″S 121°06′24″E
- Area: 399.59 km^{2} (154.28 sq mi)
- Established: 1979
- Governing body: Department of Parks and Wildlife
- Website: Official website

Peak Charles National Park is a national park in Western Australia, 507 kilometres (315 mi) east of Perth and 170 km (110 mi) north west of Esperance.

The park is named for one of the main features, Peak Charles, which is an ancient granite peak with an elevation of 651 m (2,136 ft) that dominates the park along with its neighbour Peak Eleanora. Both afford excellent views over the park, which is primarily composed of dry sand plain heaths and salt lake systems.

It is located within the IBRA sub region of the Eastern Mallee and has a number of rare plants within its boundaries including Gastrolobium acrocaroli.

No entry fee applies to enter the park but there are few facilities available to tourists. A car park, campground and toilets are available.

A 2 km (1.2 mi) looped walk trail to a lookout at the top of Peak Charles is also available which requires rock scrambling.

== See also ==
- Protected areas of Western Australia
