= Grass Patch, Western Australia =

Town and locality in the Shire of Esperance, Western Australia

Grass Patch
- Town
- Interactive map of Grass Patch
- Coordinates: 33.23°S 121.72°E
- Country: Australia
- State: Western Australia
- LGA: Shire of Esperance
- Location: 783 km (487 mi) SE of Perth; 78 km (48 mi) N of Esperance; 114 km (71 mi) S of Norseman
- Established: 1923

Government
  - State electorate: Roe
  - Federal division: O'Connor

Area
  - Total: 1,481.5 km^{2} (572.0 sq mi)
- Elevation: 218 m (715 ft)

Population
  - Total: 113 (SAL 2021)
- Postcode: 6446
Localities around Grass Patch
Salmon Gums	Salmon Gums	Salmon Gums
Lort River	Grass Patch	Buraminya
Lort River	Scaddan	Mount Ney

Grass Patch is a small town and locality in the Goldfields-Esperance region of Western Australia, located 79 km north of Esperance on the Coolgardie-Esperance Highway. The town was named after a nearby farm of the same name that had been settled around 1896 and was renowned for bountiful crops and good grass. The town is part of the Shire of Esperance, and services the local farming community.

A number of protected areas are located in Grass Patch, the Bishops, Red Lake Townsite, Truslove Townsite, Truslove North, Swan Lagoon, Jeffrey Lagoon, Ridley North and Ridley South Nature Reserves. Apart from the Grass Patch townsite, the locality also includes the Red Lake and the former Truslove townsites.

== History ==
The townsite was proposed in 1910 when land in the area was being opened up, and as a watering spot for the planned Esperance to Norseman railway, which was completed 15 years later. Although the area was already well known as "Grass Patch", locals sought a more suitable name for the town when it was gazetted in 1923. Of the three nominated, "Warden" was chosen. However, objections were soon raised about this name and later the same year it was changed back to Grass Patch.

The poor quality of the soil in the surrounding district made the development of farming in the area difficult and unproductive. In 1949 the Esperance Downs Research Station was established and it was discovered that the soil in the Esperance region was deficient in certain trace elements. The addition of these trace elements to the soil has since improved fertility and crop yields a great deal, and the region has become an important agricultural district, successfully producing wheat, barley, canola, sheep and cattle. The town is a receival site for Cooperative Bulk Handling.

The townsite of Red Lake, in the north of Grass Patch, on the Coolgardie-Esperance Highway and the railway line, was gazetted in 1922. It was originally a siding on the railway line, established in 1916. The part of the townsite west of the highway is now the Red Lake Townsite Nature Reserve. The former townsite of Truslove was located in the south of Grass Patch but, unlike Red Lake, is no longer listed as a townsite.

== Nature reserves ==
The following nature reserves are located within Grass Patch. All are located within the Mallee bioregion:

- Bishops Nature Reserve was gazetted on 15 March 1968 and has a size of 14.04 square kilometres (5.42 mi^{2}).
- Jeffrey Lagoon Nature Reserve was gazetted on 20 September 1895 and has a size of 1.21 square kilometres (0.47 mi^{2}).
- Red Lake Townsite Nature Reserve was gazetted on 14 March 1969 and has a size of 0.76 square kilometres (0.29 mi^{2}).
- Ridley North Nature Reserve was gazetted on 30 September 1966 and has a size of 3.93 square kilometres (1.52 mi^{2}).
- Ridley South Nature Reserve was gazetted on 8 October 1965 and has a size of 11.06 square kilometres (4.27 mi^{2}).
- Swan Lagoon Nature Reserve was gazetted on 18 December 1903 and has a size of 3.47 square kilometres (1.34 mi^{2}).
- Truslove North Nature Reserve was gazetted on 5 October 1917 and has a size of 1.94 square kilometres (0.75 mi^{2}).
- Truslove Townsite Nature Reserve, only partially located within Grass Patch, was gazetted on 4 February 1966 and has a size of 60.66 square kilometres (23.42 mi^{2}).
