= Hygrochloa aquatica =

Scientific classification
- Kingdom: Plantae
- Clade: Tracheophytes
- Clade: Angiosperms
- Clade: Monocots
- Clade: Commelinids
- Order: Poales
- Family: Poaceae
- Subfamily: Panicoideae
- Genus: Hygrochloa
- Species: H. aquatica

Binomial name
- Hygrochloa aquatica Lazarides

Species of grass

Hygrochloa aquatica, also known as Hall's grass, is a species of Poaceae found in Western Australia and the Northern Territory. It was present in the 2014 Catalogue of Life Annual Checklist.
