= Hygrochloa =

Scientific classification
- Kingdom: Plantae
- Clade: Tracheophytes
- Clade: Angiosperms
- Clade: Monocots
- Clade: Commelinids
- Order: Poales
- Family: Poaceae
- Subfamily: Panicoideae
- Supertribe: Panicodae
- Tribe: Paniceae
- Subtribe: Cenchrinae
- Genus: Hygrochloa; Lazarides

Type species
- Hygrochloa aquatica Lazarides

Genus of grasses

Hygrochloa is a genus of Australian plants in the grass family.

Species

- Hygrochloa aquatica Lazarides - Western Australia, Northern Territory
- Hygrochloa cravenii Lazarides - Queensland, Northern Territory
