= Hygrochloa cravenii =

Scientific classification
- Kingdom: Plantae
- Clade: Embryophytes
- Clade: Tracheophytes
- Clade: Spermatophytes
- Clade: Angiosperms
- Clade: Monocots
- Clade: Commelinids
- Order: Poales
- Family: Poaceae
- Subfamily: Panicoideae
- Genus: Hygrochloa
- Species: H. cravenii

Binomial name
- Hygrochloa cravenii Lazarides

Species of grass

Hygrochloa cravenii is a species of Poaceae found in the Northern Territory of Australia, as well as in northwestern Queensland. In Queensland, the species is of least concern under the Nature Conservation Act.
