= List of Melaleuca species =

This is a list of plants in the genus Melaleuca. In 2013, Lyndley Craven published a monograph of the genus with a description of 290 species, including about 40 sometimes known as callistemons. A new species (Melaleuca lophocoracorum) was described in a 2013 paper. Craven's inclusion of callistemons in Melaleuca is not accepted by the National Herbarium of New South Wales or by the Royal Botanic Gardens, Melbourne but is accepted by the Royal Botanic Gardens, Kew. For example, Melaleuca brachyandra is recognised in the Plants of the World Online but as Callistemon brachyandrus by the National Herbarium of New South Wales and by the Royal Botanic Gardens, Melbourne. As of November 2026, Plants of the World Online accepts 382 species.

Most melaleucas are endemic to Australia but a few species occur in parts of Malesia and Southeast Asia, and 7 species (marked *) are endemic to New Caledonia.

== A ==
- Melaleuca acacioides F.Muell. - coastal paperbark
- Melaleuca accedens (Hawkeswood) Craven & R.D.Edwards
- Melaleuca acerosa - see Melaleuca systena Craven
- Melaleuca acrifolia Craven & R.D.Edwards known in Australia as Eremaea acutifolia
- Melaleuca acuminata F.Muell. - mallee honeymyrtle
- Melaleuca acutifolia (Benth.) Craven & Lepschi
- Melaleuca adenostyla K.J.Cowley
- Melaleuca adnata Turcz.
- Melaleuca aestiva (K.J.Brooks) Craven & R.D.Edwards known in Australia as Beaufortia aestiva
- Melaleuca aestuosa G.Forst. Tahiti
- Melaleuca agathosmoides C.A.Gardner
- Melaleuca aglaia Craven & R.D.Edwards known in Australia as Calothamnus formosus
- Melaleuca alilateralis Craven & R.D.Edwards known in Australia as Calothamnus lateralis
- Melaleuca alsophila Benth. - saltwater paperbark
- Melaleuca alternifolia (Maiden & Betche) Cheel - narrow-leaved paperbark
- Melaleuca amydra Craven
- Melaleuca anisandra (Schauer) Craven & R.D.Edwards known in Australia as Beaufortia anisandra Schauer
- Melaleuca apodocephala Turcz.
- Melaleuca apostiba K.J.Cowley
- Melaleuca aquilonia Craven & R.D.Edwards known in Australia as Calothamnus borealis
- Melaleuca araucarioides Barlow
- Melaleuca arcana S.T.Blake
- Melaleuca arcuata (A.S.George) Craven & R.D.Edwards
- Melaleuca × arenicola S.Moore
- Melaleuca argentea W.Fitzg. - silver cajuput, silver-leaved paperbark
- Melaleuca arida (Hawkeswood) Craven & R.D.Edwards known in Australia as Calothamnus aridus
- Melaleuca armillaris (Gaertn.) Sm. - bracelet honeymyrtle
- Melaleuca aspalathoides Schauer
- Melaleuca asterocarpa (Hnatiuk) Craven & R.D.Edwards known in Australia as Eremaea asterocarpa
- Melaleuca atala (Hnatiuk) Craven & R.D.Edwards known in Australia as Eremaea atala
- Melaleuca atroviridis Craven & Lepschi
- Melaleuca aurea (Turcz.) Craven & R.D.Edwards known in Australia as Conothamnus aureus

== B ==
- Melaleuca barlowii Craven
- Melaleuca basicephala Benth.
- Melaleuca beardii Craven
- Melaleuca beaufortioides (Benth.) Craven & R.D.Edwards known in Australia as Eremaea beaufortioides
- Melaleuca biconvexa Byrnes
- Melaleuca bisulcata F.Muell.
- Melaleuca blackwelliana (Hnatiuk) Craven & R.D.Edwards known in Australia as Eremaea blackwelliana
- Melaleuca blaeriifolia Turcz.
- Melaleuca blepharosperma (F.Muell.) Craven & R.D.Edwards known in Australia as Calothamnus blepharospermus
- Melaleuca boeophylla Craven
- Melaleuca borealis Craven
- Melaleuca brachyandra (Lindl.) Craven (=Callistemon brachyandrus) - prickly bottlebrush
- Melaleuca bracteata F.Muell. - black teatree, river teatree, mock olive
- Melaleuca bracteosa Turcz.
- Melaleuca brevifolia Turcz. - mallee honey-myrtle
- Melaleuca brevisepala *(J.W.Dawson) Craven & J.W.Dawson
- Melaleuca bromelioides Barlow
- Melaleuca brongniartii *Daeniker
- Melaleuca brophyi Craven
- Melaleuca buseana *(Guillaumin) Craven & J.W.Dawson

== C ==
- Melaleuca caeca Craven
- Melaleuca cajuputi Powell cajuput or white samet
- Melaleuca calcicola (Barlow ex Craven) Craven & Lepschi
- Melaleuca calothamnoides F.Muell.
- Melaleuca calycina R.Br.
- Melaleuca calyptroides Craven
- Melaleuca campanae Craven
- Melaleuca camptoclada Quinn
- Melaleuca capitata Cheel
- Melaleuca cardiophylla F.Muell. - umbrella bush, tangling melaleuca
- Melaleuca caroli-huegelii Craven & R.D.Edwards known in Australia as Calothamnus huegelii
- Melaleuca carrii Craven
- Melaleuca cheelii C.T.White
- Melaleuca chisholmii (Cheel) Craven (=Callistemon chisholmii) - Burra bottlebrush
- Melaleuca chrysantherea (F.Muell.) Craven & R.D.Edwards known in Australia as Calothamnus chrysanthereus
- Melaleuca ciliosa Turcz.
- Melaleuca cinerea Craven & R.D.Edwards known in Australia as Beaufortia incana
- Melaleuca citrina (Curtis) Dum.Cours. (=Callistemon citrinus) - crimson bottlebrush
- Melaleuca citrolens Barlow
- Melaleuca clarksonii Barlow
- Melaleuca clavifolia Craven
- Melaleuca cliffortioides Diels
- Melaleuca × codonocarpa (Hnatiuk) Craven & R.D.Edwards known in Australia as Eremaea × codonocarpa
- Melaleuca coccinea A.S.George - goldfields bottlebrush
- Melaleuca comboynensis (Cheel) Craven (=Callistemon comboynensis) - cliff bottlebrush
- Melaleuca comosa A.R.Bean
- Melaleuca concinna Turcz.
- Melaleuca concreta F.Muell.
- Melaleuca condylosa Craven
- Melaleuca conothamnoides C.A.Gardner
- Melaleuca cordata Turcz.
- Melaleuca cornucopiae Byrnes
- Melaleuca coronicarpa D.A.Herb. (See Melaleuca marginata)
- Melaleuca crispii Craven & R.D.Edwards
- Melaleuca crossota Craven & R.D.Edwards known in Australia as Regelia ciliata
- Melaleuca croxfordiae Craven
- Melaleuca ctenoides Quinn
- Melaleuca cucullata Turcz.
- Melaleuca cupularis (A.S.George) Craven & R.D.Edwards known in Australia as Calothamnus cupularis
- Melaleuca curtifolia Craven & R.D.Edwards known in Australia as Eremaea brevifolia
- Melaleuca cuspidata Turcz. known in Australia as Conothamnus trinervis
- Melaleuca cuticularis Labill. - saltwater paperbark
- Melaleuca cyathifolia Craven & R.D.Edwards known in Australia as Regelia cymbifolia
- Melaleuca cyrtodonta Turcz. known in Australia as Beaufortia cyrtodonta

== D ==
- Melaleuca dawsonii *Craven
- Melaleuca dealbata S.T.Blake - karnbor, swamp teatree, soapy teatree
- Melaleuca deanei F.Muell.
- Melaleuca decora (Salisb.) Britten white feather honeymyrtle
- Melaleuca decussata R.Br. - totem poles, cross-leaved honey-myrtle
- Melaleuca delta Craven
- Melaleuca dempta (Barlow) Craven
- Melaleuca dendroidea (Hnatiuk) Craven & R.D.Edwards known in Australia as Eremaea dendroidea
- Melaleuca densa R.Br.
- Melaleuca densispicata Byrnes
- Melaleuca depauperata Turcz.
- Melaleuca depressa Diels
- Melaleuca dichroma Craven & Lepschi (formerly Melaleuca virgata)
- Melaleuca diosmatifolia Dum.Cours. (sometimes known as Melaleuca erubescens)
- Melaleuca diosmifolia Andrews
- Melaleuca dissitiflora F.Muell. - creek teatree

== E ==
- Melaleuca ebracteata (F.Muell.) Craven & R.D.Edwards known in Australia as Eremaea ebracteata
- Melaleuca ectadioclada (Hnatiuk) Craven & R.D.Edwards known in Australia as Eremaea ectadioclada
- Melaleuca eleuterostachya F.Muell.
- Melaleuca elliptica Labill. - granite bottlebrush
- Melaleuca empetrifolia Rchb. known in Australia as Beaufortia empetrifolia
- Melaleuca ericifolia Sm. - swamp paperbark
- Melaleuca eriocarpa (Lindl.) ined.
- Melaleuca eulobata Craven
- Melaleuca eurystoma Barlow ex Craven
- Melaleuca eximia (K.J.Cowley) Craven
- Melaleuca exuvia Craven

== F ==
- Melaleuca fabri Craven
- Melaleuca faucicola Craven (= Callistemon pauciflorus) - desert bottlebrush
- Melaleuca ferruginea Craven & Cowie
- Melaleuca filifolia F.Muell. - wiry honeymyrtle
- Melaleuca fissurata Barlow
- Melaleuca flammea Craven (=Callistemon acuminatus) - tapering-leaved bottlebrush
- Melaleuca flavovirens (Cheel) Craven (=Callistemon flavovirens) - green bottlebrush
- Melaleuca fluviatilis Barlow
- Melaleuca foliolosa A.Cunn. ex Benth.
- Melaleuca formosa (S.T.Blake) Craven (=Callistemon formosus, C. speciosus) - Kingaroy bottlebrush
- Melaleuca fulgens R.Br. - scarlet honeymyrtle

== G ==
- Melaleuca gardneri Craven & R.D.Edwards known in Australia as Regelia megacephala
- Melaleuca genialis Lepschi
- Melaleuca georgei Craven & R.D.Edwards known in Australia as Calothamnus montanus
- Melaleuca gibbosa Labill. - slender honey-myrtle, small-leaved honey-myrtle
- Melaleuca gilesii (F.Muell.) Craven & R.D.Edwards known in Australia as Calothamnus gilesii
- Melaleuca glaberrima F.Muell.
- Melaleuca glabra (Benth.) Craven & R.D.Edwards known in Australia as Calothamnus glaber
- Melaleuca glauca (DC.) Craven (=Callistemon glaucus) - Albany bottlebrush
- Melaleuca glena Craven
- Melaleuca globifera R.Br.
- Melaleuca glomerata F.Muell. - desert honey-myrtle
- Melaleuca glumacea Craven & R.D.Edwards known in Australia as Beaufortia bracteosa
- Melaleuca gnidiifolia Vent. (See Melaleuca thymifolia Sm.)
- Melaleuca gnidioides *Brongn. and Gris
- Melaleuca gracilis (R.Br.) Craven & R.D.Edwards Known in Australia as Calothamnus gracilis
- Melaleuca granitica (Hawkeswood) Craven & R.D.Edwards known in Australia as Calothamnus graniticus
- Melaleuca grieveana Craven
- Melaleuca groveana Cheel & C.T.White - Grove's paperbark

== H ==
- Melaleuca hadra (Hnatiuk) Craven & R.D.Edwards known in Australia as Eremaea hadra
- Melaleuca hakeifolia (Gaudich.) Craven & R.D.Edwards known in Australia as Lamarchea hakeifolia
- Melaleuca halmaturorum F.Muell. ex Miq. - kangaroo honey-myrtle
- Melaleuca halophila Craven
- Melaleuca hamata Fielding & Gardner
- Melaleuca hamulosa Turcz.
- Melaleuca haplantha Barlow
- Melaleuca hawkeswoodii Craven & R.D.Edwards
- Melaleuca hemisticta S.T.Blake ex Craven (=Callistemon hemistictus) - Mount Wheeler bottlebrush
- Melaleuca hirsuta (Hawkeswood) Craven & R.D.Edwards known in Australia as Calothamnus hirsutus
- Melaleuca hislopii Craven & R.D.Edwards known in Australia as Calothamnus villosus
- Melaleuca hnatiukii Craven
- Melaleuca hollidayi Craven
- Melaleuca holosericea Schauer
- Melaleuca howeana Cheel - Lord Howe Island teatree
- Melaleuca huegelii Endl. - chenille honeymyrtle
- Melaleuca huttensis Craven
- Melaleuca hypericifolia Sm. - hillock bush

== I – K ==
- Melaleuca idana Craven
- Melaleuca incana R.Br. - grey honeymyrtle
- Melaleuca inops (Schauer) Craven & R.D.Edwards known in Australia as Regelia inops
- Melaleuca interioris Craven & Lepschi
- Melaleuca interstans (F.Muell.) Craven & R.D.Edwards known in Australia as Beaufortia puberula
- Melaleuca irbyana R.T.Baker - weeping paperbark
- Melaleuca johnsonii Craven
- Melaleuca jonesii Craven & R.D.Edwards known in Australia as Beaufortia schaueri
- Melaleuca kalbarriensis (Hawkeswood) ined.
- Melaleuca keigheryi Craven
- Melaleuca kunzeoides Byrnes
- Melaleuca kybeliona Craven & R.D.Edwards known in Australia as Eremaea violacea

== L ==
- Melaleuca lachnocephala Craven & R.D.Edwards known in Australia as Beaufortia eriocephala
- Melaleuca laetifica Craven
- Melaleuca lanceolata Otto - Rottnest tea tree, black paperbark, moonah
- Melaleuca lara Craven
- Melaleuca lasiandra F.Muell.
- Melaleuca lateralis Turcz.
- Melaleuca lateriflora Benth. - gorada
- Melaleuca lateritia A.Dietr. - robin redbreast bush
- Melaleuca laxiflora Turcz.
- Melaleuca lazaridis Craven (= Callistemon lazaridis)
- Melaleuca lecanantha Barlow
- Melaleuca leiocarpa F.Muell.
- Melaleuca leiopyxis Benth.
- Melaleuca lepschii Craven & R.D.Edwards known in Australia as Phymatocarpus interioris
- Melaleuca leptospermoides Schauer
- Melaleuca leucadendra (L.) L. - weeping paperbark, long-leaved paperbark, white paperbark
- Melaleuca leuropoma Craven
- Melaleuca linariifolia Sm. - snow-in-summer, narrow-leaved paperbark, budjur
- Melaleuca linearifolia (Link) Craven
- Melaleuca linearis Schrad. & J.C.Wendl. (= Callistemon linearis, C. pinifolius, C. rigidus)
- Melaleuca linguiformis Craven
- Melaleuca linophylla F.Muell.
- Melaleuca longissima (F.Muell.) Craven & R.D.Edwards known in Australia as Calothamnus longissimus
- Melaleuca longistaminea (F.Muell.) Barlow ex. Craven
- Melaleuca lophantha (Vent.) ined.
- Melaleuca lophocoracorum A.J.Ford, Craven & Brophy
- Melaleuca lutea Craven

== M ==
- Melaleuca macrocarpa (Hawkeswood) Craven & R.D.Edwards known in Australia as Calothamnus macrocarpus
- Melaleuca macronychia Turcz.
- Melaleuca macrostemon (Lindl.) Craven & R.D.Edwards known in Australia as Beaufortia macrostemon
- Melaleuca manglesii Schauer
- Melaleuca marginata (Sond.) Hislop, Lepschi & Craven (formerly Melaleuca coronicarpa)
- Melaleuca maxwellii (F.Muell.) Craven & R.D.Edwards known in Australia as Phymatocarpus maxwellii
- Melaleuca megacephala F.Muell.
- Melaleuca megalongensis Craven & S.M.Douglas (= Callistemon megalongensis) - Megalong Valley bottlebrush
- Melaleuca micrantha (Schauer) Craven & R.D.Edwards known in Australia as Beaufortia micrantha
- Melaleuca microcarpa (F.Muell.) Craven & R.D.Edwards known In Australia as Calothamnus microcarpus
- Melaleuca micromera Schauer wattle honeymyrtle
- Melaleuca microphylla Sm.
- Melaleuca minutifolia F.Muell. - teatree
- Melaleuca monantha (K.J.Cowley) Craven
- Melaleuca montana (S.T.Blake) Craven (= Callistemon montanus) - mountain bottlebrush
- Melaleuca montis-zamia Craven (= Callistemon montis-zamiae)
- Melaleuca × mulleola Craven & R.D.Edwards known in Australia as Eremaea × phoenicea

== N ==
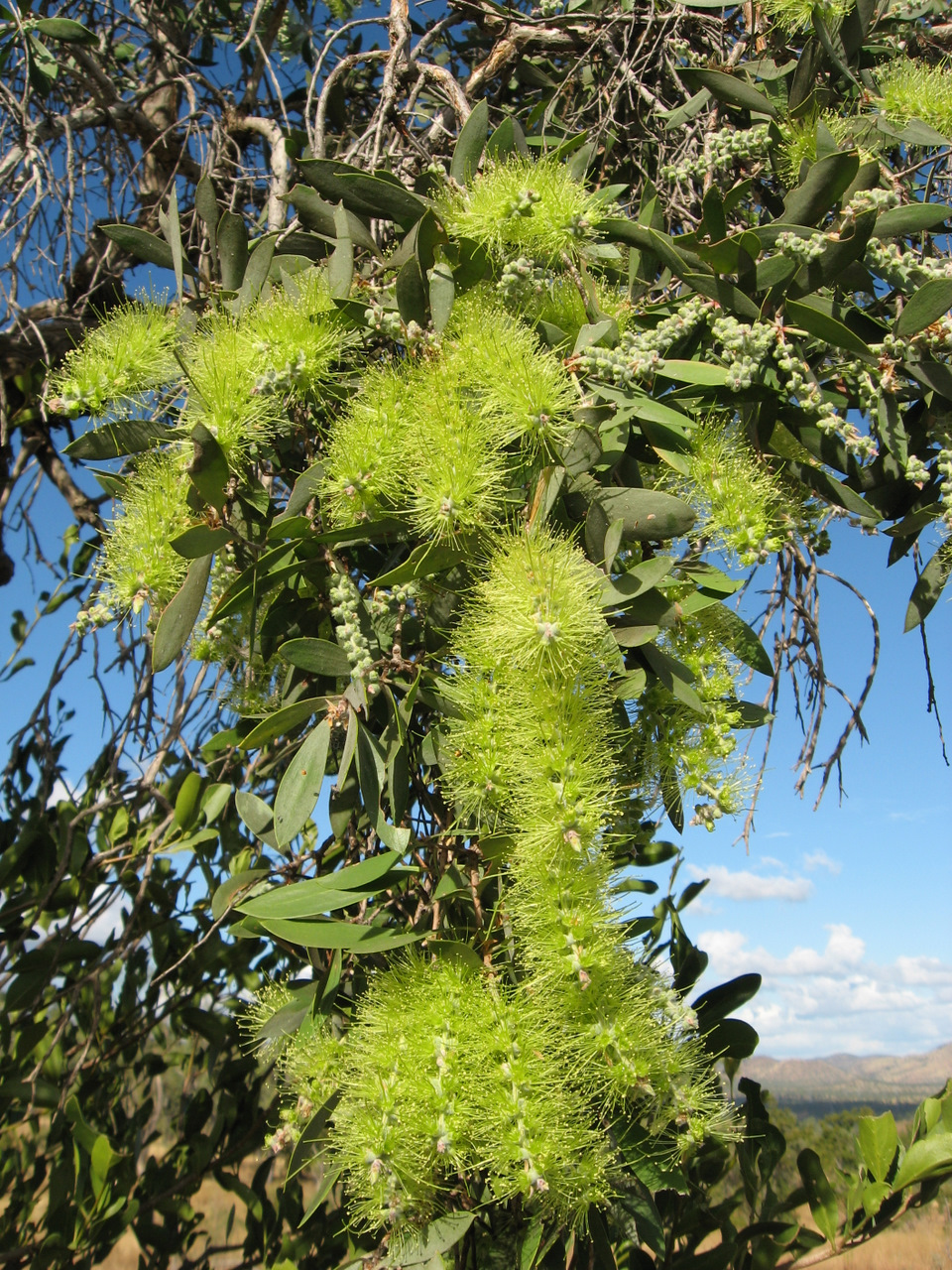
Melaleuca nervosa

- Melaleuca nanophylla Carrick dwarf-leaved honey-myrtle
- Melaleuca nematophylla F.Muell. ex Craven - wiry honeymyrtle
- Melaleuca nervosa (Lindl.) Cheel (= Callistemon nervosus) - fibrebark
- Melaleuca nesophila F.Muell. - mindiyed, showy honey-myrtle,
- Melaleuca nodosa (Sol. ex Gaertn.) Sm. - prickly-leaved paperbark

== O ==
- Melaleuca oblivia A.R.Bean
- Melaleuca ochroma Lepschi
- Melaleuca oldfieldii F.Muell. ex Benth.
- Melaleuca orbicularis Craven
- Melaleuca orbifolia (F.Muell.) Craven & R.D.Edwards known in Australia as Beaufortia orbifolia
- Melaleuca ordinifolia Barlow
- Melaleuca ostrina Craven & R.D.Edwards known in Australia as Eremaea purpurea
- Melaleuca orophila Craven (= Callistemon teretifolius) - needle bottlebrush, Flinders Ranges bottlebrush
- Melaleuca osullivanii Craven & Lepschi
- Melaleuca oxyphylla Carrick - pointed-leaved honey-myrtle

== P – Q ==
- Melaleuca pachyphylla (Cheel) Craven (= Callistemon pachyphyllus) - wallum bottlebrush
- Melaleuca pachystachya (Benth.) Craven & R.D.Edwards known in Australia as Calothamnus pachystachyus
- Melaleuca pallescens Byrnes
- Melaleuca pallida (Bonpl.) Craven (= Callistemon pallidus) - lemon bottlebrush
- Melaleuca paludicola Craven (= Callistemon paludosus, Callistemon sieberi) - river bottlebrush
- Melaleuca pancheri * (Brongn. & Griseb.) Craven & J.W.Dawson
- Melaleuca papillosa Craven
- Melaleuca parviceps Lindl. - rough honey-myrtle
- Melaleuca parvistaminea Byrnes
- Melaleuca pauciflora Turcz.
- Melaleuca pauperiflora F.Muell. - Boree
- Melaleuca pearsonii (R.D.Spencer & Lumley) Craven (= Callistemon pearsonii) - Blackdown bottlebrush
- Melaleuca penicula (K.J.Cowley) Craven
- Melaleuca pentagona Labill.
- Melaleuca peucophylla Craven & R.D.Edwards known in Australia as Calothamnus pinifolius
- Melaleuca phellosa (A.S.George) Craven & R.D.Edwards known in Australia as Calothamnus phellosus
- Melaleuca phoenicea (Lindl.) Craven (= Callistemon phoeniceus) - scarlet bottlebrush, lesser bottlebrush
- Melaleuca phoidophylla Craven
- Melaleuca phratra Craven (= Callistemon phratra)
- Melaleuca pilosa (Lindl.) ined.
- Melaleuca pityoides (F.Muell.) Craven
- Melaleuca planifolia (Lehm.) Craven & R.D.Edwards known in Australia as Calothamnus planifolius
- Melaleuca platycalyx Diels
- Melaleuca plumea Craven
- Melaleuca plumosa (Turcz.) ined.
- Melaleuca podiocarpa Craven
- Melaleuca polandii (F.M.Bailey) Craven (= Callistemon polandii) – gold-tipped bottlebrush
- Melaleuca polycephala Benth.
- Melaleuca pomphostoma Barlow
- Melaleuca porphyrocephala (F.Muell.) Craven & R.D.Edwards known in Australia as Phymatocarpus porphyrocephalus
- Melaleuca preissiana Schauer - stout paperbark, modong or moonah
- Melaleuca preissii (Schauer) Craven & R.D.Edwards known in Australia as Calothamnus preissii
- Melaleuca pritzelii (Domin) Barlow
- Melaleuca procera Craven
- Melaleuca propinqua S.Schauer known in Australia as Melaleuca densa
- Melaleuca protrusa Craven & Lepschi
- Melaleuca protumida Craven & R.D.Edwards known in Australia as Calothamnus gibbosus
- Melaleuca psammophila Diels
- Melaleuca pulchella R.Br. - claw flower
- Melaleuca pulcherrima Craven & R.D.Edwards known in Australia as Beaufortia squarrosa
- Melaleuca pungens Schauer
- Melaleuca punicea Byrnes
- Melaleuca purpurea (Lindl.) Craven & R.D.Edwards known in Australia as Beaufortia purpurea
- Melaleuca pustulata Hook.f. - yellow, warty or Cranbrook paperbark
- Melaleuca pyramidalis Craven (= Callistemon pyramidalis)
- Melaleuca quadrifaria F.Muell. - limestone honey-myrtle
- Melaleuca quadrifida (R.Br.) Craven & R.D.Edwards known in Australia as Calothamnus quadrifidus
- Melaleuca quercina Craven (= Callistemon quercinus) - Oakey bottlebrush
- Melaleuca quinquenervia (Cav.) S.T.Blake – niaouli, broad-leaved paperbark

== R ==
- Melaleuca radula Lindl. - graceful honeymyrtle
- Melaleuca recurva (R.D.Spencer & Lumley) Craven (= Callistemon recurvus) - Tinaroo bottlebrush
- Melaleuca relativa Craven & R.D.Edwards
- Melaleuca rhaphiophylla Schauer - swamp paperbark
- Melaleuca rigidifolia Turcz.
- Melaleuca ringens Barlow
- Melaleuca robusta (Schauer) Craven & R.D.Edwards known in Australia as Calothamnus robustus
- Melaleuca rosea (A.S.George) Craven & R.D.Edwards known in Australia as Calothamnus roseus
- Melaleuca rugulosa (Schltdl. ex Link) Craven (= Callistemon macropunctatus, C. rugulosus, C. coccineus) - scarlet bottlebrush
- Melaleuca rupestris (Schauer) Craven & R.D.Edwards known in Australia as Calothamnus rupestris
- Melaleuca ryeae Craven

== S ==
- Melaleuca sabrina Craven (= Callistemon sabrina)
- Melaleuca salicina Craven (= Callistemon salignus) - white or willow bottlebrush
- Melaleuca saligna Schauer
- Melaleuca sapientes Craven
- Melaleuca scabra R.Br. - rough honeymyrtle
- Melaleuca scabrida (A.S.George) Craven & R.D.Edwards known in Australia as Calothamnus scabridus
- Melaleuca scalena Craven & Lepschi
- Melaleuca schaueri (Lehm.) Craven & R.D.Edwards known in Australia as Calothamnus schaueri
- Melaleuca sciotostyla Barlow - Wongan melaleuca
- Melaleuca scitula Craven & R.D.Edwards known in Australia as Beaufortia elegans
- Melaleuca sclerophylla Diels
- Melaleuca sculponeata Barlow
- Melaleuca seriata Lindl.
- Melaleuca sericea Byrnes
- Melaleuca serpentina Craven (= Callistemon serpentinus)
- Melaleuca sheathiana W.Fitzg. - boree
- Melaleuca shiressii (Blakely) Craven (= Callistemon shiressii)
- Melaleuca sieberi Schauer
- Melaleuca similis Craven
- Melaleuca societatis Craven
- Melaleuca sophisma Lepschi
- Melaleuca sparsa (R.Br.) Craven & R.D.Edwards known in Australia as Beaufortia sparsa
- Melaleuca sparsiflora Turcz.
- Melaleuca spathulata Schauer
- Melaleuca spectabilis (Barlow ex Craven) Craven & Lepschi
- Melaleuca sphaerodendra *Craven & J.W.Dawson
- Melaleuca spicigera S.Moore
- Melaleuca sprengelioides DC. known in Australia as Beaufortia sprengelioides
- Melaleuca squamea Labill. - swamp honeymyrtle
- Melaleuca squamophloia (Byrnes) Craven
- Melaleuca squarrosa Donn ex Sm. - scented paperbark
- Melaleuca stenostachya S.T.Blake - fibre-barked or straight teatree
- Melaleuca stereophloia Craven
- Melaleuca stipitata (K.J.Cowley) Craven
- Melaleuca stramentosa Craven
- Melaleuca striataLabill.
- Melaleuca strobophylla Barlow
- Melaleuca styphelioides Sm. - prickly-leaved paperbark
- Melaleuca subalaris Barlow
- Melaleuca suberosa (Schauer) C.A.Gardner - corky honeymyrtle
- Melaleuca subfalcata Turcz.
- Melaleuca subtrigona Schauer
- Melaleuca subulata (Cheel) Craven (= Callistemon subulatus)
- Melaleuca sulcata (A.S.George) Craven & R.D.Edwards known in Australia as Lamarchea sulcata
- Melaleuca superba (Hawkeswood & Mollemans) Craven & R.D.Edwards known in Australia as Calothamnus superbus
- Melaleuca sylvana (K.J.Cowley) Craven
- Melaleuca systena Craven - coastal honeymyrtle

== T ==
- Melaleuca tamariscinaHook. - bush-house paperbark or tamarix honey-myrtle
- Melaleuca teretifolia Endl. - banbar
- Melaleuca teuthidoides Barlow
- Melaleuca thapsina Craven
- Melaleuca thymifolia Sm. - thyme honey-myrtle
- Melaleuca thymoides Labill.
- Melaleuca thyoides Turcz. - salt lake honey-myrtle
- Melaleuca thysanota Craven & R.D.Edwards known in Australia as Eremaea fimbriata
- Melaleuca tinkeri Craven
- Melaleuca torquata Barlow
- Melaleuca tortifolia Byrnes
- Melaleuca torulosa (Schauer) Craven & R.D.Edwards known in Australia as Calothamnus torulosus
- Melaleuca transversa Craven & R.D.Edwards
- Melaleuca trichophylla Lindl.
- Melaleuca trichostachya Lindl.
- Melaleuca triumphalis Craven
- Melaleuca tuberculata Schauer
- Melaleuca tuberosa (Hawkeswood) Craven & R.D.Edwards known in Australia as Calothamnus tuberosus

== U ==
- Melaleuca ulicoides Craven & Lepschi
- Melaleuca uncinata R.Br. - broom bush, broom honeymyrtle
- Melaleuca undulata Benth. - hidden honeymyrtle
- Melaleuca urceolaris F.Muell. ex Benth.
- Melaleuca uxorum Craven G.Holmes & Sankowsky

== V ==
- Melaleuca valida (S.Moore) Craven & R.D.Edwards known in Australia as Calothamnus validus
- Melaleuca variegata Craven & R.D.Edwards known in Australia as Beaufortia bicolor
- Melaleuca velutina (Turcz.) Craven & R.D.Edwards known in Australia as Regelia velutina
- Melaleuca venusta Craven
- Melaleuca villosisepala Craven
- Melaleuca viminalis (Sol. ex Gaertn.) Byrnes (= Callistemon viminalis) - weeping or creek bottlebrush
- Melaleuca viminea Lindl. - mohan
- Melaleuca vinnula Craven & Lepschi
- Melaleuca violacea Schauer
- Melaleuca virens Craven (= Callistemon viridiflorus) - lime bottlebrush
- Melaleuca virgata (Benth.) Craven (See Melaleuca dichroma)
- Melaleuca viridiflora Gaertn. - broad-leaved paperbark

== W – Z ==
- Melaleuca williamsii Craven (= Callistemon pungens)
- Melaleuca wilsonii F.Muell. - Wilson's or violet honey-myrtle
- Melaleuca wimmerensis (Marriott & G.W.Carr) Craven (= Callistemon wimmerensis) - Wimmera bottlebrush
- Melaleuca wonganensis Craven
- Melaleuca xerophila Barlow
- Melaleuca zeteticorum Craven & Lepschi
- Melaleuca zonalis Craven
