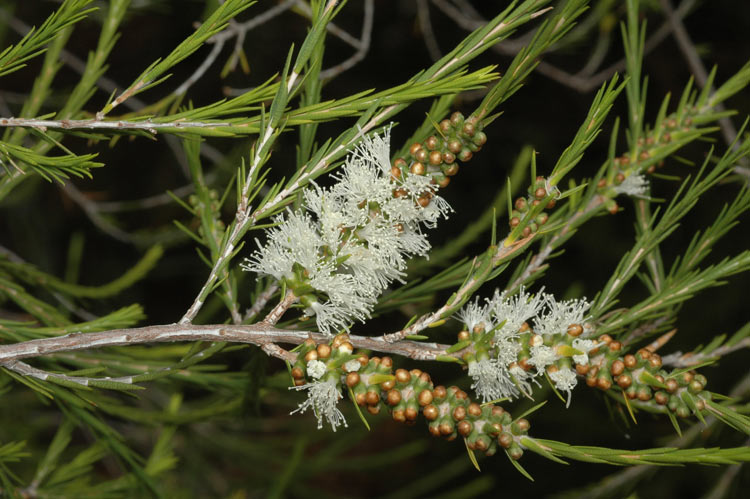

Scientific classification
- Kingdom: Plantae
- Clade: Tracheophytes
- Clade: Angiosperms
- Clade: Eudicots
- Clade: Rosids
- Order: Myrtales
- Family: Myrtaceae
- Genus: Melaleuca
- Species: M. densispicata

Binomial name
- Melaleuca densispicata Byrnes

= Melaleuca densispicata =

Species of flowering plant

Melaleuca densispicata is a plant in the myrtle family Myrtaceae and is native to Queensland and New South Wales in Australia. It is a dense, woody shrub or tree with papery or scaly bark, sharp pointed leaves and dense flower spikes. It is uncommon throughout its range and was not formally described until 1984.

== Description ==
Melaleuca densispicata grows to a height of 4 m (10 ft), sometimes to 5 m (20 ft). Its leaves are in alternating pairs (decussate), each leaf measuring 3–13.5 mm (0.1–0.5 in) long, 0.6–1.2 mm (0.02–0.05 in) wide, linear to narrow elliptic in shape, glabrous and lacking a stalk.

The flowers are white and arranged on a dense spike up to 40 mm (2 in) long, usually at the end of branches which continue to grow after the flowering period. Each spike contains between 5 and 24 flowers, each flower with five bundles of stamens, each bundle with 8 to 15 stamens. Flowering mainly occurs from September to December but also from February to May. The fruit are woody capsules about 2.2–2.6 mm (0.087–0.10 in) long, densely packed together.

== Taxonomy and naming ==
Melaleuca densispicata was first formally described by Byrnes in 1984 in Austrobaileya. The specific epithet (densispicata) is from the Latin densus (dense) and spica (spike) referring to the flowers being close together in the inflorescence".

== Distribution and habitat ==
Melaleuca densispicata occurs in disjunct populations on the western Darling Downs in Queensland and on the North West Slopes, North West Plains and Far North West Plains in New South Wales. It grows on plains in low-lying areas and along stream channels in heavy clay soils.
