= North West Plains (New South Wales) =

The North West Plains region of New South Wales, Australia, includes the administrative areas of Moree Plains Shire, Narrabri Shire, Gunnedah Shire and Liverpool Plains Shire councils. The region is important economically for agricultural industries, especially for broadacre cropping and cotton production, and accounts for 12.7% of the Gross Value of Production of the state, despite being only 5.9% of the state's agricultural production area.

In 2016, the Australian Bureau of Statistics reported the population of the region as 46,145.

The natural vegetation of the area is shrubland or low woodland, with an open to semi-continuous groundcover dominated by tussock grasses.
