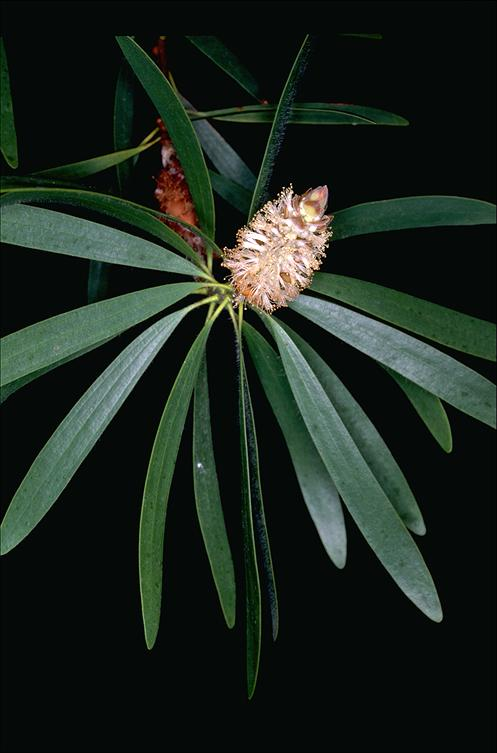

Scientific classification
- Kingdom: Plantae
- Clade: Tracheophytes
- Clade: Angiosperms
- Clade: Eudicots
- Clade: Rosids
- Order: Myrtales
- Family: Myrtaceae
- Genus: Melaleuca
- Species: M. cornucopiae

Binomial name
- Melaleuca cornucopiae Byrnes

= Melaleuca cornucopiae =

Species of shrub

Melaleuca cornucopiae is a shrub in the myrtle family Myrtaceae and is endemic to western Arnhem Land in the Northern Territory of Australia. It is distinguished by it unusual flowering spike - a horn-like structure covered by overlapping bracts with the flowers opening in succession, starting from the bottom of the spike.

== Description ==
Melaleuca cornucopiae is a shrub to 4 m (10 ft) with grey, papery bark. Its stiff leaves are arranged alternately along the stems and are 40–105 mm (2–4 in) long, 4–15 mm (0.2–0.6 in) wide, narrow oval to narrow elliptic in shape with a long stalk, a rounded end and 3 to 7 distinct longitudinal veins.

The flowers occur on a spike, usually at the end the branches which continue to grow after the flowering period. The flowers open in succession from the bottom end of the spike which contains 10 to 50 groups of flowers in threes. The petals are 1.9–2.2 mm (0.075–0.087 in) long and fall off as the flowers open and the white stamens are arranged in five bundles around the flower, each bundle containing 5 or 6 stamens. Flowering occurs during summer and is followed by fruit which are as woody capsules, each about 3.4 mm (0.13 in) long.

== Taxonomy and naming ==
Melaleuca cornucopiae was first formally described by Norman Byrnes in 1984 in Austrobaileya. The specific epithet (cornucopiae) refers to the horn-like appearance of the flower spike.

== Distribution and habitat ==
This melaleuca occurs in western Arnhem Land in mixed woodland growing in sandy soils on sandstone.
