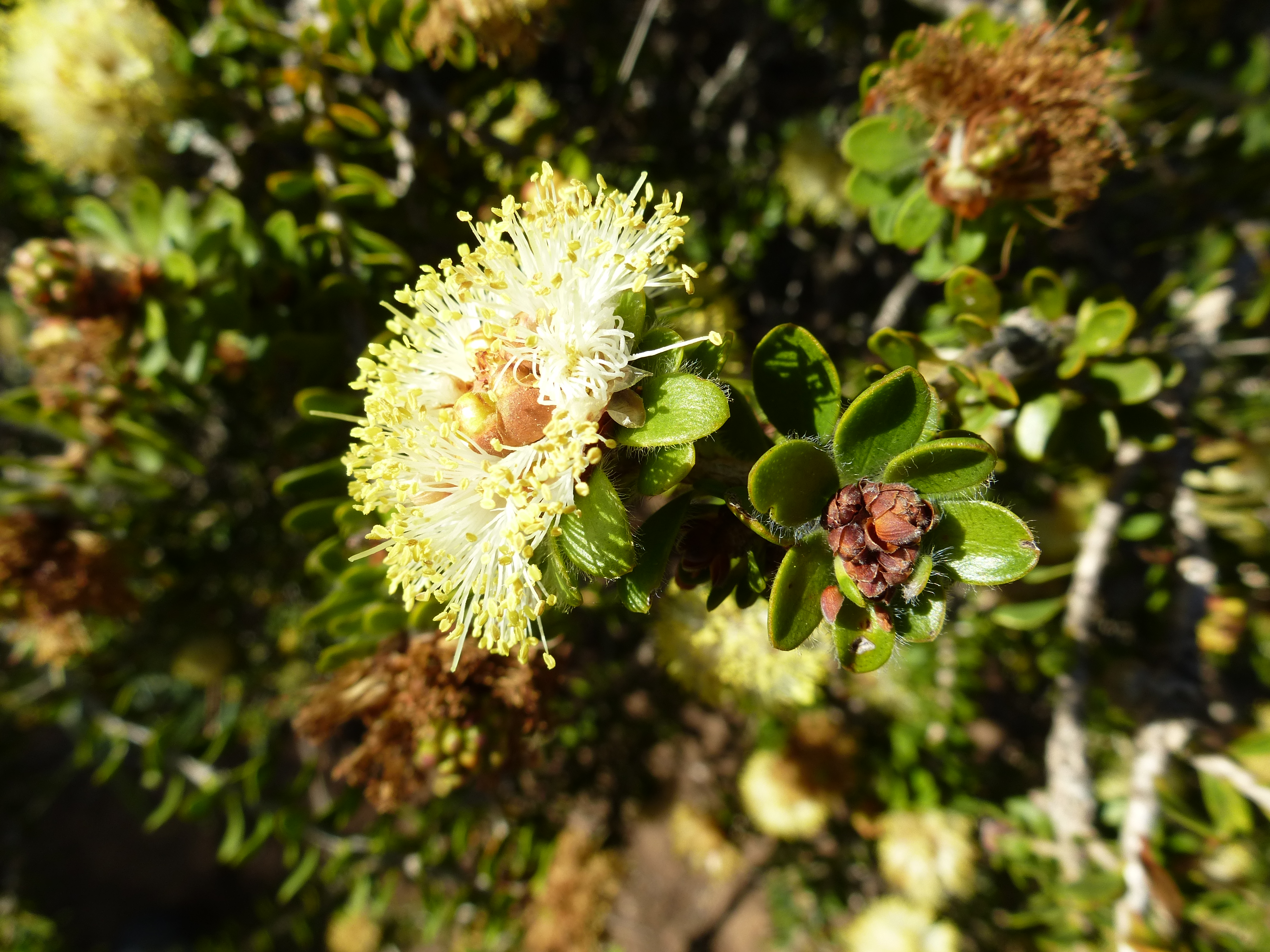

Scientific classification
- Kingdom: Plantae
- Clade: Tracheophytes
- Clade: Angiosperms
- Clade: Eudicots
- Clade: Rosids
- Order: Myrtales
- Family: Myrtaceae
- Genus: Melaleuca
- Species: M. depressa

Binomial name
- Melaleuca depressa Diels

Synonyms
- Melaleuca depressa var. geraldtonensis Hochr.

= Melaleuca depressa =

Species of shrub

Melaleuca depressa is a plant in the myrtle family, Myrtaceae and is endemic to the south-west of Western Australia. It is a small, bushy shrub with clusters of yellow or cream flowers on the ends of its branches in spring.

== Description ==
Melaleuca depressa usually grows to a height of about 0.5 m (2 ft) but in some situations to 2 m (7 ft). Its leaves are arranged alternately, are 6.4–12.5 mm (0.3–0.5 in) long and 1.4–5.5 mm (0.06–0.2 in) wide, oval to elliptic or narrowly so. The leaf stalk is very short and the end is pointed but not sharp.

The flower are a shade of cream to yellow and are arranged in heads on the ends of branches which continue to grow after flowering, or sometimes in the upper leaf axils. Each head has between 2 and 6 groups of flowers in threes. The petals are 2.5–3.0 mm (0.1–0.1 in) long and fall off as the flower opens. The stamens are arranged in five bundles around the flower, each bundle containing 9 to 13 stamens. Flowering occurs from July to November but mainly from September and the fruit which follow flowering are woody capsules 3–4.5 mm (0.1–0.2 in) long with part of the sepals remaining as teeth.

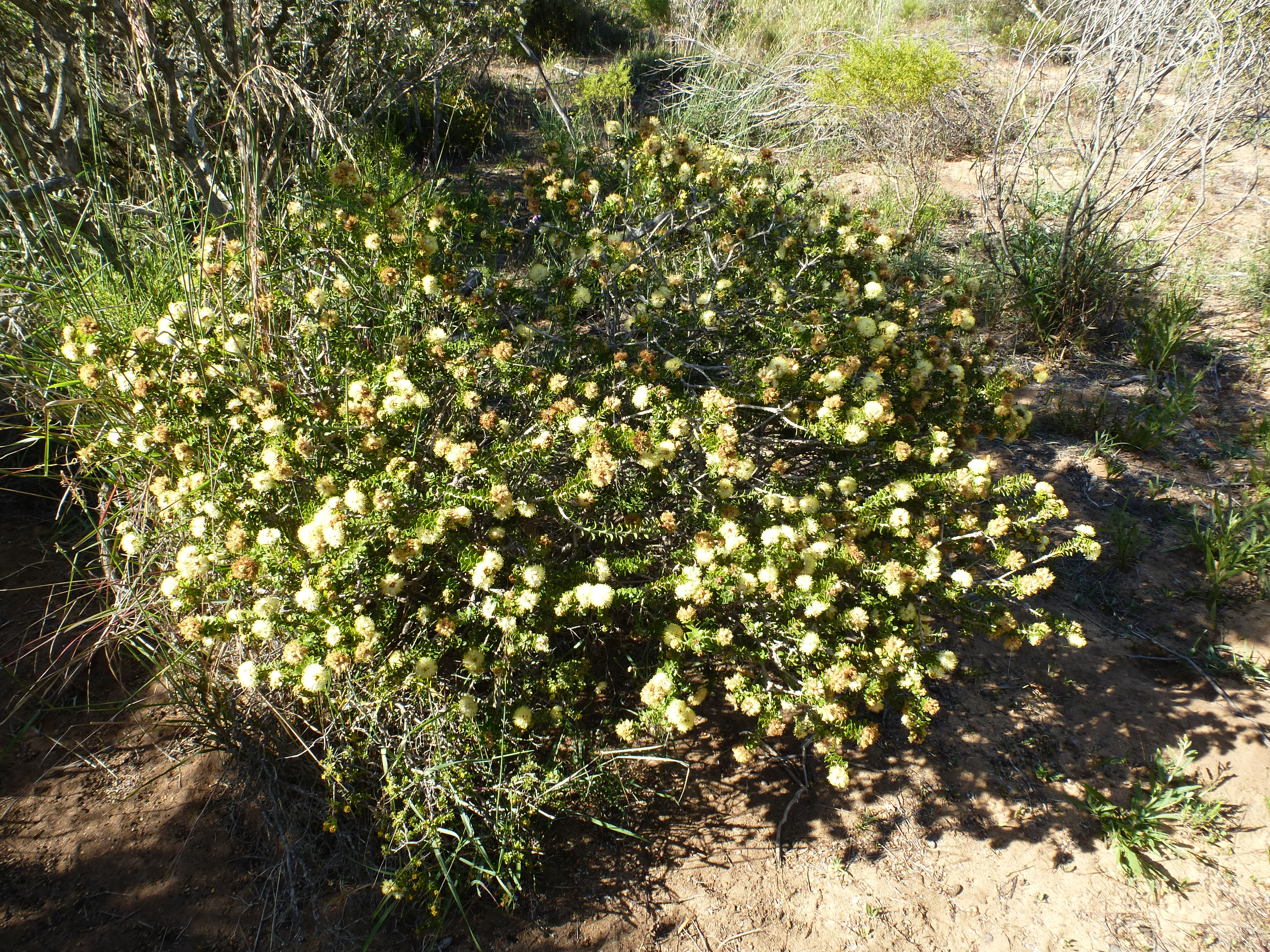
Habit

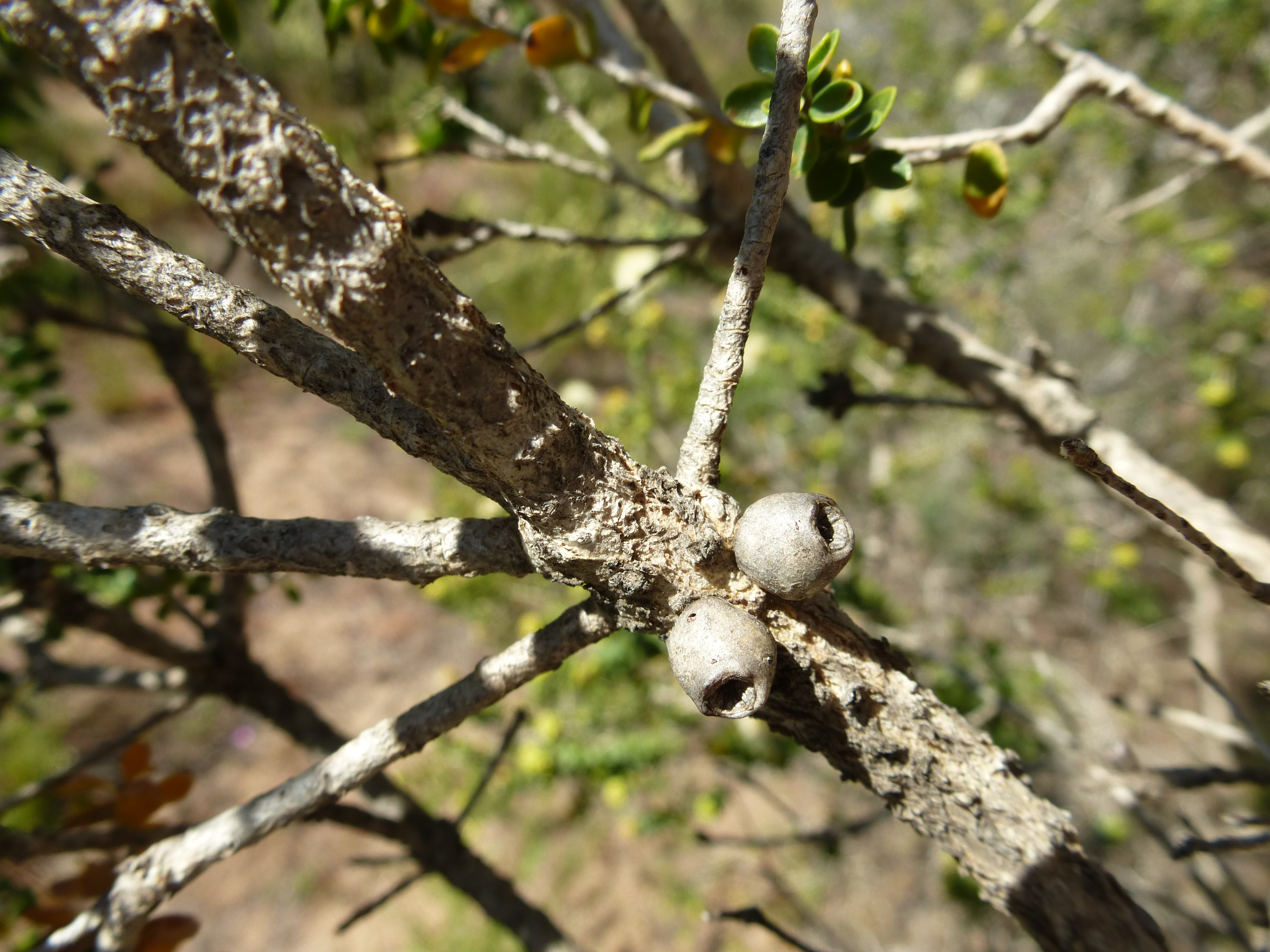
Fruit

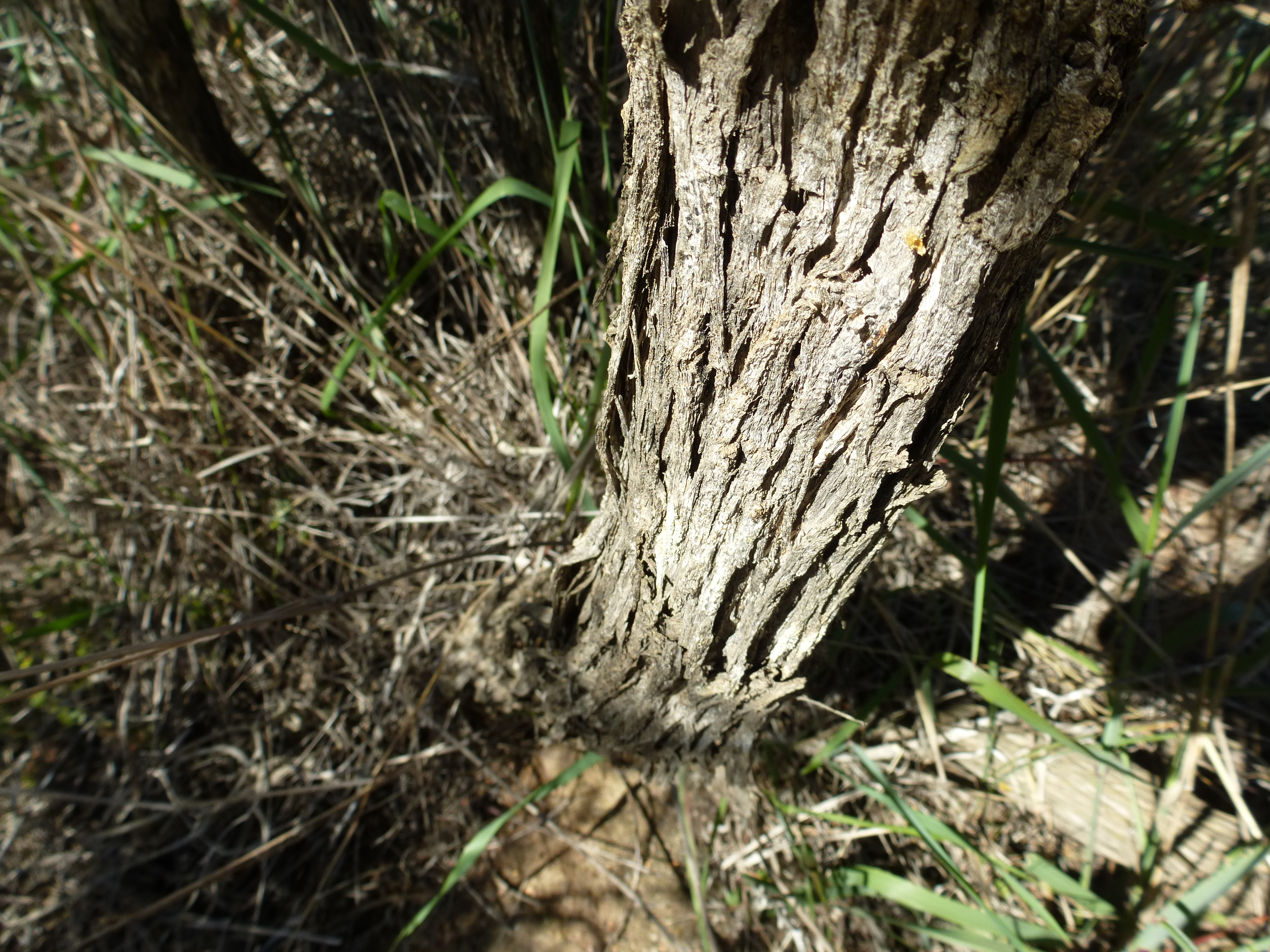
Bark

== Taxonomy and naming ==
Melaleuca depressa was first formally described in 1904 by Ludwig Diels in Botanische jahrbucher fur systematik, pflanzengeschichte und pflanzengeographie under the heading Fragmenta Phytographiae Australiae occidentalis:Beitrage zur Kenntnis der Pflanzen Westaustraliens, ihrer Verbreitung und ihrer Lebensverhaltnisse ("Contributions to the knowledge of the plants of West Australia, where they are found and their conditions of existence"). The specific epithet (depressa) is from the Latin depressus meaning "flattened from above, somewhat sunken at the centre", although it is not clear why Diels chose this epithet.

== Distribution and habitat ==
Melaleuca depressa occurs in the Geraldton and Northampton districts in the Avon Wheatbelt and Geraldton Sandplains biogeographic regions. It grows in sandy soils over sandstone and limestone.

== Conservation status ==
This species is classified as not threatened by the Government of Western Australia Department of Parks and Wildlife.
