= Melaleuca basicephala =

Conservation status
- Priority Four — Rare Taxa (DEC)

Scientific classification
- Kingdom: Plantae
- Clade: Tracheophytes
- Clade: Angiosperms
- Clade: Eudicots
- Clade: Rosids
- Order: Myrtales
- Family: Myrtaceae
- Genus: Melaleuca
- Species: M. basicephala

Binomial name
- Melaleuca basicephala Benth.

Synonyms
- Myrtoleucodendron basicephalum (Benth.) Kuntze

Species of shrub

Melaleuca basicephala is a plant in the myrtle family, Myrtaceae and is endemic to the south-west of Western Australia. It is a rarely-seen shrub from the dense freshwater swamps of the wet far south-west corner of the state.

== Description ==
Melaleuca basicephala grows to a height of about 0.9 m (40 in) with glabrous branches. The leaves are in alternating opposite pairs (decussate) and are 8–12.5 mm (0.3–0.5 in) long, 1.8–2.5 mm (0.07–0.1 in) wide, oval or tear-drop shaped and glabrous.

The flowers are in heads on the previous year's shoots in groups of two to ten, the heads up to 10 mm (0.4 in) in diameter. The stamens are in five bundles around the flower, each bundle with 17 to 23 pinkish-purple or mauve-pink stamens. Flowering occurs from November to February. The fruits are 3 mm (0.1 in) long.

== Taxonomy and naming ==
Melaleuca basicephala was first formally described in 1867 by George Bentham in Flora Australiensis. The specific epithet (basicephala) is from the latinised Greek basis meaning "base" and -cephalus meaning "headed" referring "to the inflorescences usually being at the base of lateral shoots."

== Distribution and habitat ==
This species occurs in dense swamps in the Augusta and Northcliffe districts in the Jarrah Forest and Warren biogeographic regions. It grows in black, peaty sand and clay in winter-wet flats and swamps.

== Conservation ==
Melaleuca basicephala is classified as priority four by the Government of Western Australia Department of Parks and Wildlife meaning that it is rare or near threatened and in need of monitoring.
