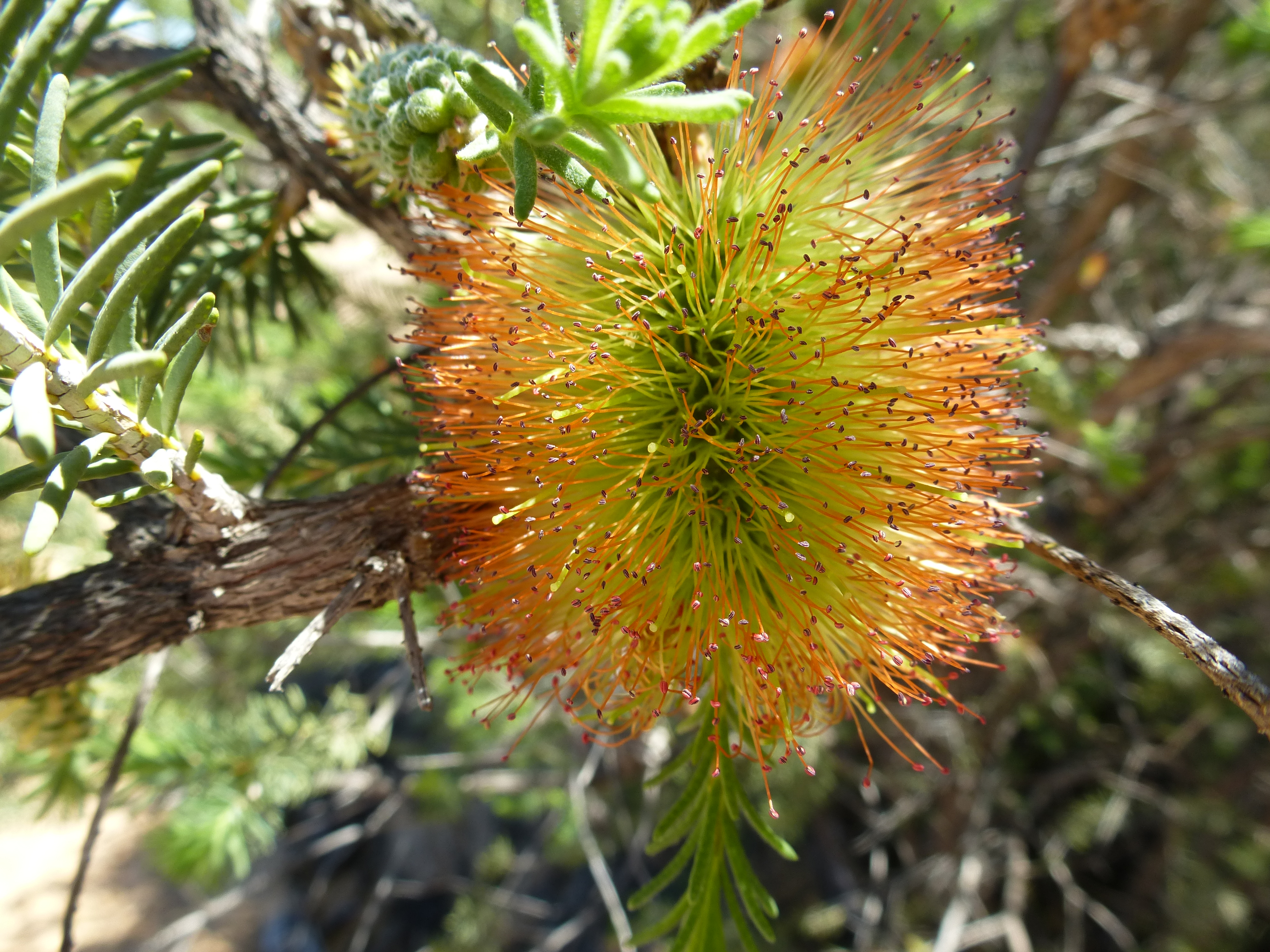

Scientific classification
- Kingdom: Plantae
- Clade: Tracheophytes
- Clade: Angiosperms
- Clade: Eudicots
- Clade: Rosids
- Order: Myrtales
- Family: Myrtaceae
- Genus: Melaleuca
- Species: M. calothamnoides

Binomial name
- Melaleuca calothamnoides F.Muell.

Synonyms
- Myrtoleucodendron calothamnoides (F.Muell.) Kuntae

= Melaleuca calothamnoides =

Species of flowering plant

Melaleuca calothamnoides is a plant in the myrtle family, Myrtaceae and is endemic to a relatively small area on the west coast of Western Australia. It has attractive red and green flowering spikes and soft foliage but has proven to be difficult to grow in gardens.

== Description ==
Melaleuca calothamnoides is a shrub growing to a height of 1–4 metres (3–10 ft) and about 1.5 m (5 ft) wide with rough bark. The leaves are arranged alternately and 7.5–13.5 mm (0.3–0.5 in) long and 0.5–0.9 mm (0.02–0.04 in) wide. They are glabrous, fleshy, linear and almost circular in cross section with a blunt, curved tip.

The flowers are arranged in cylindrical spikes that are 40–50 mm (1.6–2.0 in) long and wide. The spikes occur on old wood and there are 40 to 60 flowers on each spike. The stamens are arranged in five bundles around the flowers with 4 to 5 stamens per bundle, and are usually green in the centre grading to red at the tips. Flowering occurs over an extended period from July to October. The fruit are woody capsules in dense spikes 40–50 mm (1.6–2.0 in) along the stem long and each capsule is 4–5 mm (0.16–0.20 in) long and wide.

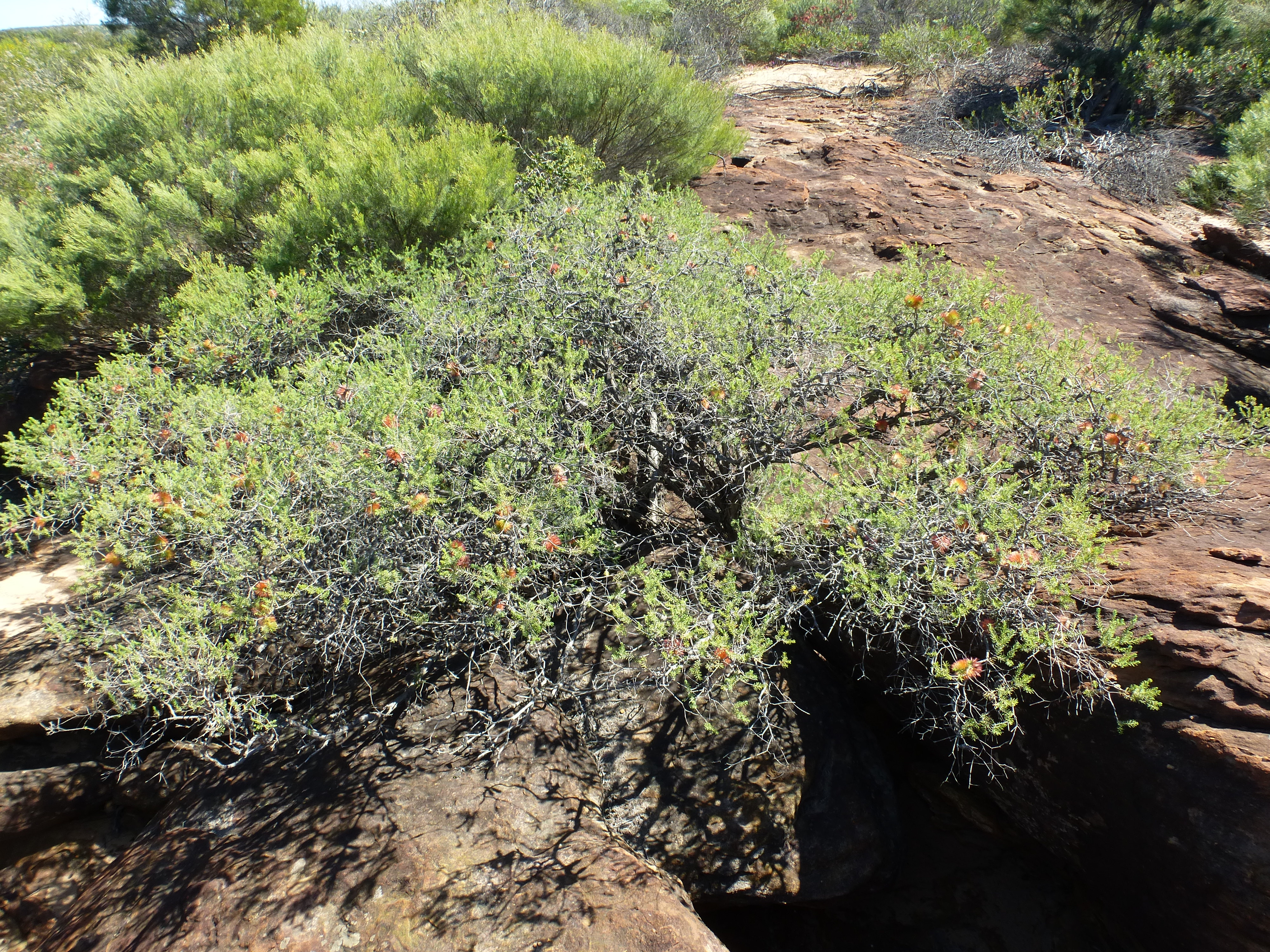
Habit in a dry creek bed near Kalbarri

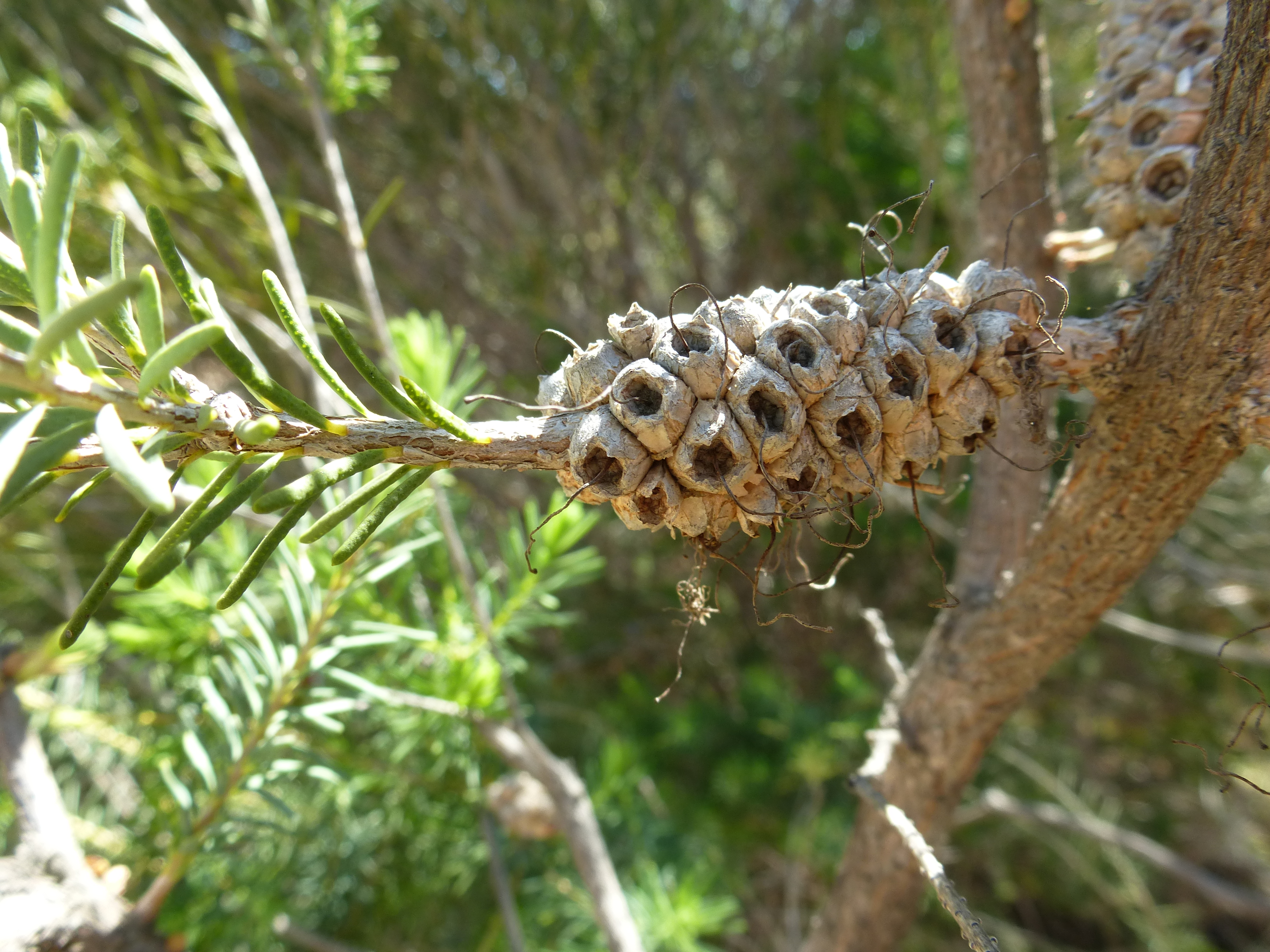
Leaves and fruit

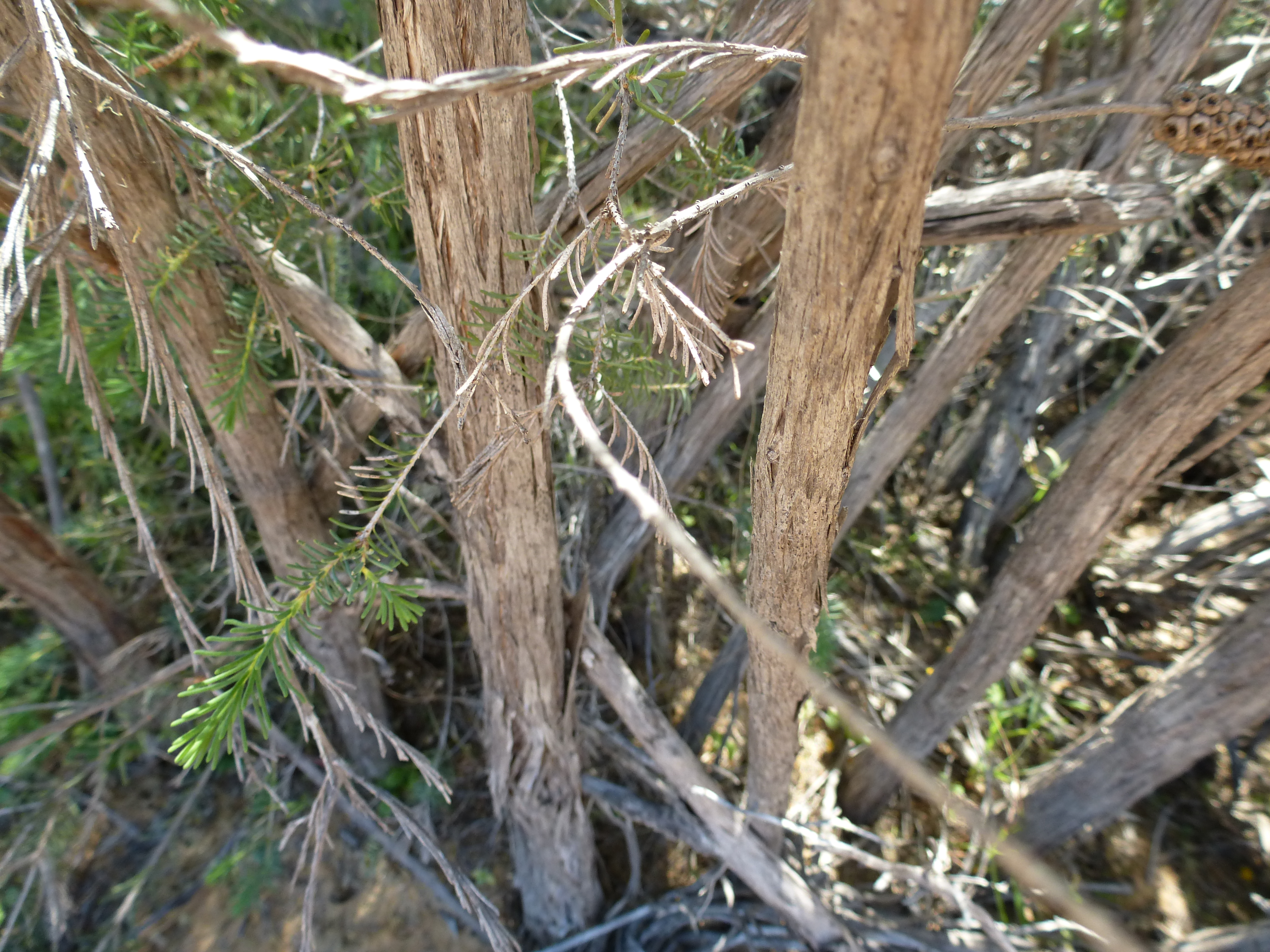
Bark

== Taxonomy and naming ==
Melaleuca calothamnoides was first formally described in 1862 by Ferdinand von Mueller in Fragmenta Phytographiae Australiae from a specimen found "in limestone hills near the Murchison River by Augustus Oldfield". The specific epithet (calothamnoides) refers to the similarity of this species to one in the genus Calothamnus. The ending -oides is a Latin suffix meaning "resembling" or "having the form of".

== Distribution and habitat ==
This melaleuca occurs in the Murchison River area in the Geraldton Sandplains biogeographic region. It has a restricted distribution but is locally common, especially in dry gullies and creek beds.

== Conservation status ==
Melaleuca calothamnoides is listed as not threatened by the Government of Western Australia Department of Parks and Wildlife.

== Use in horticulture ==
The red and green flowering spikes and soft foliage of this shrub are particularly attractive but it is difficult to grow in the garden. It can be propagated easily from seed or cuttings but will only grow in well-drained, acidic soils.
