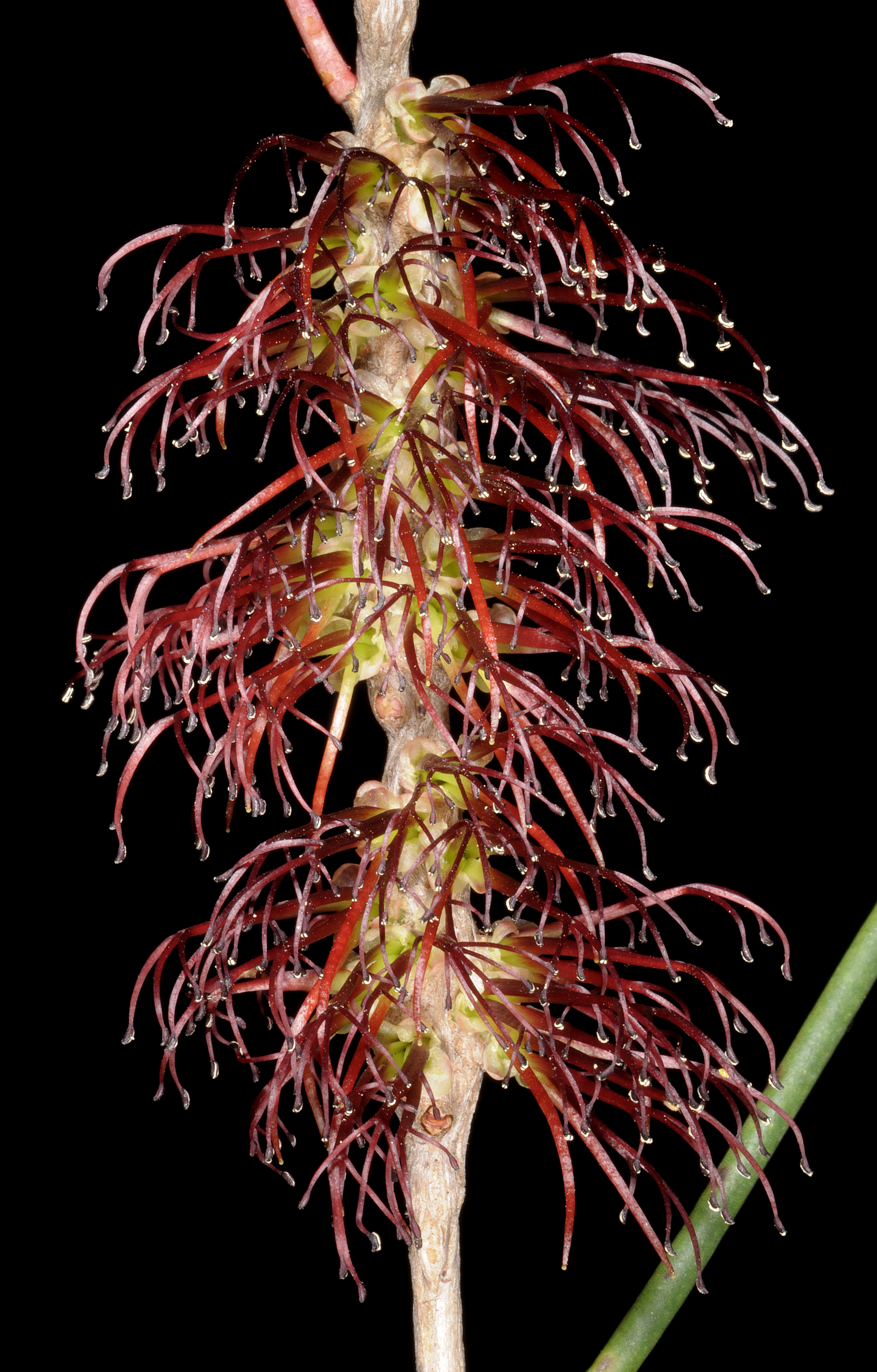

Scientific classification
- Kingdom: Plantae
- Clade: Tracheophytes
- Clade: Angiosperms
- Clade: Eudicots
- Clade: Rosids
- Order: Myrtales
- Family: Myrtaceae
- Genus: Calothamnus
- Species: C. lateralis

Binomial name
- Calothamnus lateralis Lindl.

Synonyms
- Calothamnus lateralis f. longifolius (Lehm.) Benth.; Calothamnus longifolia Lehm. orth. var.; Calothamnus longifolius Lehm.; Melaleuca alilateralis Craven & R.D.Edwards; Melaleuca alilateralis Craven & R.D.Edwards var. alilateralis

= Calothamnus lateralis =

Species of plant

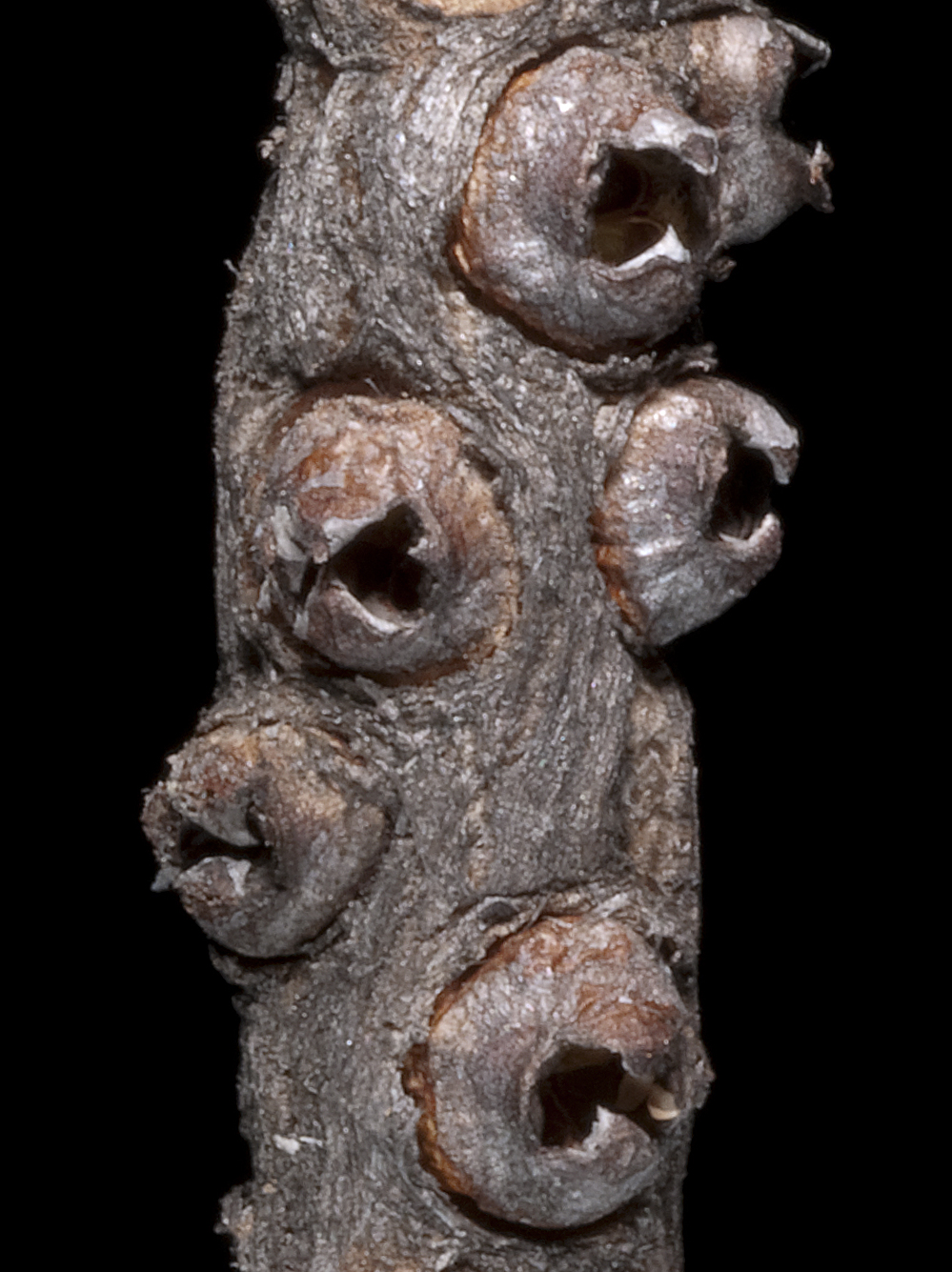
Fruit

Calothamnus lateralis is a plant in the myrtle family, Myrtaceae and is endemic to the south-west of Western Australia. It is a small, spreading shrub with long, cylindrical leaves and blood red flowers with their bases buried in the plant's corky bark.

== Description ==
Calothamnus lateralis grows to about 1 metre (3.3 ft) high and 1–2 metres (3.3–6.6 ft) wide. Its leaves are mostly 70–100 millimetres (3–4 in) long, narrow and circular in cross section. The flowers are blood red and arranged in spikes 40–100 millimetres (2–4 in) long on one side of the stems. The flowers are buried in the corky bark so that only the tips of the sepals, the petals, stamens, stigma and style are visible. The stamens are arranged in four, narrow, claw-like bundles. Flowering can occur in almost any month of the year and is followed by fruits which are woody capsules.

In describing this species, John Lindley wrote:

...in this case the inflorescence is so peculiar as to deserve to become the subject of special enquiry.

== Taxonomy and naming ==
Calothamnus lateralis was first formally described by John Lindley in 1839 in A Sketch of the Vegetation of the Swan River Colony. The specific epithet (lateralis) is a Latin word meaning "lateral" or "belonging to the side" referring to the flowers being arranged on one side of the stem.

== Distribution and habitat ==
Calothamnus lateralis occurs from Perth along the south-west coast to Albany and the Stirling Range in the Jarrah Forest, Swan Coastal Plain and Warren biogeographic regions. It grows in peaty sand or clay in swamps and areas that are flooded in winter.

== Conservation ==
Calothamnus lateralis is classified as "not threatened" by the Western Australian Government Department of Parks and Wildlife.
