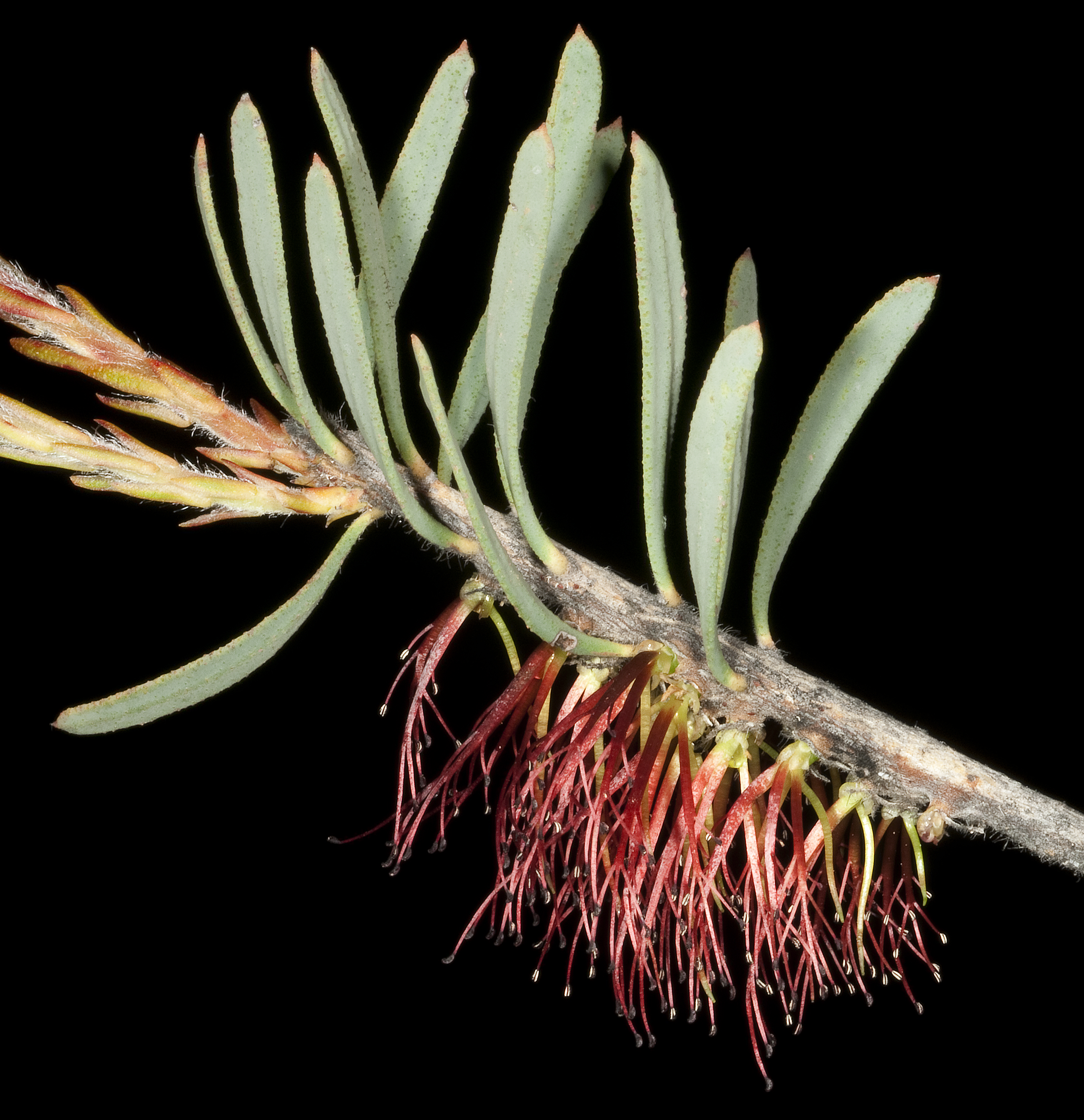

Scientific classification
- Kingdom: Plantae
- Clade: Tracheophytes
- Clade: Angiosperms
- Clade: Eudicots
- Clade: Rosids
- Order: Myrtales
- Family: Myrtaceae
- Genus: Calothamnus
- Species: C. planifolius

Binomial name
- Calothamnus planifolius Lehm.

Synonyms
- List: Calothamnus planifolia f. angustifolia Schauer orth. var.; Calothamnus planifolia f. latifolia Schauer orth. var.; Calothamnus planifolia var. angustifolia Schauer orth. var.; Calothamnus planifolia var. latifolia Schauer orth. var.; Calothamnus planifolius f. angustifolius Schauer nom. illeg.; Calothamnus planifolius f. latifolius Schauer; Calothamnus planifolius var. angustifolius Schauer nom. illeg.; Calothamnus planifolius var. latifolius Schauer; Melaleuca planifolia (Lehm.) Craven & R.D.Edwards

= Calothamnus planifolius =

Species of flowering plant

Calothamnus planifolius is a plant in the myrtle family, Myrtaceae and is endemic to the south-west of Western Australia. It is an erect shrub with many branches, growing to a height of about 1.5 metres (4.9 ft) with flat leaves and red flowers from September to November. The flowers have 4 petals and 4 narrow bundles of stamens. (In 2014 Craven, Edwards and Cowley proposed that the species be renamed Melaleuca planifolia.)

The species was first formally described by Johann Lehmmann in 1842 in Delectus Seminum quae in Horto Hamburgensium botanico e collectione.

Calothamnus planifolius occurs in the Avon Wheatbelt and Jarrah Forest biogeographic regions where it grows in gravelly clay over laterite. It is classified as "not threatened" by the Western Australian Government Department of Parks and Wildlife.
