= Calothamnus microcarpus =

Conservation status
- Priority Four — Rare Taxa (DEC)

Scientific classification
- Kingdom: Plantae
- Clade: Tracheophytes
- Clade: Angiosperms
- Clade: Eudicots
- Clade: Rosids
- Order: Myrtales
- Family: Myrtaceae
- Genus: Calothamnus
- Species: C. microcarpus

Binomial name
- Calothamnus microcarpus F.Muell.

Synonyms
- Calothamnus microcarpa F.Muell. orth. var.; Calothamnus microcarpus F.Muell. var. microcarpus; Melaleuca microcarpa Craven & R.D.Edwards

Species of flowering plant

Calothamnus microcarpus is a plant in the myrtle family, Myrtaceae and is endemic to the south-west of Western Australia. It is an erect, either compact or spreading shrub with flat leaves and clusters of red flowers in spring. (In 2014 Craven, Edwards and Cowley proposed that the species be renamed Melaleuca microcarpa.)

== Description ==
Calothamnus microcarpus is an erect shrub with an otherwise variable habit, growing to a height of 1.0–1.5 metres (3–5 ft). Its leaves are flat and have two grooves along both the upper and lower surfaces.

The flowers are bright red and arranged in small groups and the stamens are arranged in 4 claw-like bundles. Flowering occurs in spring and is followed by fruits which are small, woody capsules about 5 millimetres (0.2 in) in diameter.

== Taxonomy and naming ==
Calothamnus microcarpus was first formally described in 1862 by Victorian Government Botanist Ferdinand von Mueller in his Fragmenta Phytographiae Australiae. The specific epithet microcarpus is derived from the ancient Greek words mikros (μικρός) meaning "small" and karpos (καρπός) meaning "fruit".

== Distribution and habitat ==
Calothamnus microcarpus occurs in the Esperance Plains and Jarrah Forest biogeographic regions where it grows in clay and sandy soils.

== Conservation status ==
Calothamnus microcarpus is listed as "Priority Four" by the Government of Western Australia Department of Biodiversity, Conservation and Attractions, meaning that is rare or near threatened.
