= Calothamnus affinis =

Scientific classification
- Kingdom: Plantae
- Clade: Tracheophytes
- Clade: Angiosperms
- Clade: Eudicots
- Clade: Rosids
- Order: Myrtales
- Family: Myrtaceae
- Genus: Calothamnus
- Species: C. affinis

Binomial name
- Calothamnus affinis Turcz.

Synonyms
- Calothamnus affinis Turcz. var. affinis; Calothamnus affinis var. longistamineus Domin; Calothamnus affinis var. teres Blackall & Grieve nom. inval.; Calothamnus microcarpus var. teres Benth.; Melaleuca relativa Craven & R.D.Edwards

Species of flowering plant

Calothamnus affinis is a plant in the myrtle family (Myrtaceae), endemic to the south-west of Western Australia. It is an erect, compact, or spreading shrub that produces red to purple flowers in spring.

== Description ==
Calothamnus affinis is a compact shrub growing to a height of about 2.0 metres (7 ft) with pale green, cylindrical leaves with their end tapering to a point. The flowers have 5 sepals, 5 petals and stamens joined to form 5 claw-like bundles.

== Distribution and habitat ==
Calothamnus affinis occurs in the far south of Western Australia in the Stirling Range district in the Avon Wheatbelt, Esperance Plains and Jarrah Forest biogeographic regions. It grows in sandy soils and laterite.

== Taxonomy and naming ==
Calothamnus affinis was first formally described in 1852 by Nikolai Turczaninow. The specific epithet (affinis) means "allied to" or "akin to", and refers to the similarity of this species to Calothamnus gracilis.

In 2014 Craven, Edwards and Cowley proposed that the species be renamed Melaleuca relativa but the name is not accepted by the Australian Plant Census.

== Conservation ==
This species is classified as "not threatened" by the Western Australian Government Department of Parks and Wildlife.
