= Calothamnus arcuatus =

Conservation status
- Priority Two — Poorly Known Taxa (DEC)

Scientific classification
- Kingdom: Plantae
- Clade: Tracheophytes
- Clade: Angiosperms
- Clade: Eudicots
- Clade: Rosids
- Order: Myrtales
- Family: Myrtaceae
- Genus: Calothamnus
- Species: C. arcuatus

Binomial name
- Calothamnus arcuatus A.S.George

Synonyms
- Melaleuca arcuata (A.S.George) Craven & R.D.Edwards

Species of flowering plant

Calothamnus arcuatus is a plant in the myrtle family, Myrtaceae and is endemic to the south-west of Western Australia. (In 2014 Craven, Edwards and Cowley proposed that the species be renamed Melaleuca arcuata.) It is a shrub with prickly, cylindrical leaves with a slight, upward curve and bright red flowers in small groups near the older leaves.

== Description ==
Calothamnus arcuatus grows to a height and width of about 1.5 metres (5 ft) with an underground swelling called a lignotuber. Its leaves are needle-like, mostly 2–5 millimetres (0.08–0.2 in) long and 0.7–1.1 millimetres (0.03–0.04 in) wide, circular in cross section and tapering at the end to a sharp point. They are glabrous, spreading from the stem and curve slightly upwards.

The flowers are bright red and arranged in small clusters amongst the older leaves. The outer edge of the flower cup (the hypanthium) and the sepals are densely covered with soft hairs. The petals are 2.5–3 millimetres (0.098–0.12 in) long and have a jagged edge. The stamens are arranged in claw-like bundles 22–25 millimetres (0.87–0.98 in) long. Flowering occurs in autumn and early winter and is followed by fruit that are woody, almost spherical capsules, 5–6 millimetres (0.20–0.24 in) long.

== Taxonomy and naming ==
Calothamnus arcuatus was first formally described in 2010 by Alex George from a specimen found near Enaebba. "The Latin arcuatus (curved like a bow) refers to the leaves".

== Distribution and habitat ==
Calothamnus arcuatus occurs in two separate areas - one to the north east of Eneabba and the other to the north east of Arrino, in the Avon Wheatbelt and Geraldton Sandplains biogeographic regions. It grows in sand, sometimes with lateritic gravel on sandplains and ridges.

== Conservation ==
Calothamnus arcuatus is classified as "Priority Two" by the Western Australian Government Department of Parks and Wildlife meaning that it is poorly known and from one or a few locations.
