= Calothamnus lehmannii =

Scientific classification
- Kingdom: Plantae
- Clade: Tracheophytes
- Clade: Angiosperms
- Clade: Eudicots
- Clade: Rosids
- Order: Myrtales
- Family: Myrtaceae
- Genus: Calothamnus
- Species: C. lehmannii

Binomial name
- Calothamnus lehmannii Schauer

Synonyms
- Calothamnus lehmanni Schauer orth. var.; Calothamnus plumosa Turcz. orth. var.; Calothamnus plumosus Turcz.; Melaleuca johannis-lehmannii Craven & R.D.Edwards

Species of flowering plant

Calothamnus lehmannii, commonly known as dwarf claw flower, is a plant in the myrtle family, Myrtaceae and is endemic to the south-west of Western Australia. It is a low-lying, sometimes ground-hugging shrub with long, thin, cylindrical leaves and clusters of red flowers that are smaller than any others in the genus Calothamnus.

== Description ==
Calothamnus lehmannii grows to a height of about 0.5 metres (1.6 ft). Its leaves are 10–25 millimetres (0.4–1 in) long and circular in cross section.

The flowers are arranged in small clusters and partly buried in the corky bark of the stems. They are red and have 4 sepals, 4 petals and 4 claw-like bundles of stamens, all less than 10 millimetres (0.4 in) long. The upper two bundles contain only 4 or 5 stamens and the lower ones are reduced to a single stamen. Flowering occurs between August and October and is followed by fruits which are woody capsules.

== Taxonomy and naming ==
Calothamnus lehmannii was first formally described by Johannes Schauer in 1843 in Dissertatio phytographica de Regelia, Beaufortia et Calothamno. The specific epithet (lehmannii) honours the German botanist, Johann Lehmann. (In 2014 Craven, Edwards and Cowley proposed that the species be renamed Melaleuca johannis-lehmannii.)

== Distribution and habitat ==
Calothamnus lehmannii occurs in and between the Bowelling and Stirling Range districts in the Avon Wheatbelt, Esperance Plains, Jarrah Forest and Warren biogeographic regions. It grows in sandy soils on plains and hillsides.

== Conservation ==
Calothamnus lehmannii is classified as "not threatened" by the Western Australian government department of parks and wildlife.
