= Calothamnus huegelii =

Scientific classification
- Kingdom: Plantae
- Clade: Tracheophytes
- Clade: Angiosperms
- Clade: Eudicots
- Clade: Rosids
- Order: Myrtales
- Family: Myrtaceae
- Genus: Calothamnus
- Species: C. huegelii

Binomial name
- Calothamnus huegelii Schauer

Synonyms
- Melaleuca caroli-huegelii Craven & R.D.Edwards

Species of flowering plant

Calothamnus huegelii is a plant in the myrtle family, Myrtaceae and is endemic to the south-west of Western Australia. It is an erect shrub growing to a height of about 2 metres (6.6 ft) with red flowers in autumn or September. (In 2014 Craven, Edwards and Cowley proposed that the species be renamed Melaleuca caroli-huegelii.)

Calothamnus huegelii was first formally described by Johannes Schauer in 1843 in Dissertatio phytographica de Regelia, Beaufortia et Calothamno. The specific epithet (huegelii) honours Charles von Hügel.

Calothamnus huegelii occurs in the Avon Wheatbelt, Esperance Plains, Jarrah Forest and Mallee biogeographic regions growing in sand, and gravelly clay over laterite on sandplains.

Calothamnus huegelii is classified as "not threatened" by the Western Australian government department of parks and wildlife.
