= Calothamnus phellosus =

Scientific classification
- Kingdom: Plantae
- Clade: Tracheophytes
- Clade: Angiosperms
- Clade: Eudicots
- Clade: Rosids
- Order: Myrtales
- Family: Myrtaceae
- Genus: Calothamnus
- Species: C. phellosus

Binomial name
- Calothamnus phellosus A.S.George

Synonyms
- Melaleuca phellosa (A.S.George) Craven & R.D.Edwards

Species of flowering plant

Calothamnus phellosus is a plant in the myrtle family, Myrtaceae and is endemic to the south-west of Western Australia. It is a tall, spreading shrub with needle-shaped, prickly leaves and bright red flowers with five stamen bundles. (In 2014 Craven, Edwards and Cowley proposed that the species be renamed Melaleuca phellosa.)

== Description ==
Calothamnus phellosus is a shrub growing to a height of about 4 metres (10 ft) and a width of about 6 metres (20 ft). Its leaves are needle-like, mostly 25–80 millimetres (1–3 in) long and 0.7–1.1 millimetres (0.03–0.04 in) wide, circular in cross section and tapering to a sharp, prickly point.

The flowers have 5 sepals and 5 petals. The stamens are bright red and are arranged in 5 claw-like bundles, each about 22–40 millimetres (0.87–1.6 in) long. The petals are 4.0–4.5 millimetres (0.16–0.18 in) long. Flowering occurs from September to November and is followed by fruits which are woody, flattened spherical capsules, 7–11 millimetres (0.3–0.4 in) long, often tightly packed together and which develop a corky bark.

== Taxonomy and naming ==
Calothamnus phellosus was first formally described in 2010 by Alex George in Nuytsia from a specimen found in the north of the Murchison River near Eurardy. The specific epithet (phellosus) is said to be Greek, meaning "corky", referring to the outer surface of the fruit of this species. In ancient Greek phellosus is not attested. The suffix -osus is not of Greek but of Latin origin. In ancient Greek, phellos (φελλός) is used for "cork" and phellōdēs (φελλώδης) and phellinos (φέλλινος) mean respectively "of cork" and "made of cork".

== Distribution and habitat ==
Calothamnus phellosus occurs in the Avon Wheatbelt, Geraldton Sandplains and Yalgoo biogeographic regions.

== Conservation ==
Calothamnus phellosus is classified as "not threatened" by the Western Australian government department of parks and wildlife.
