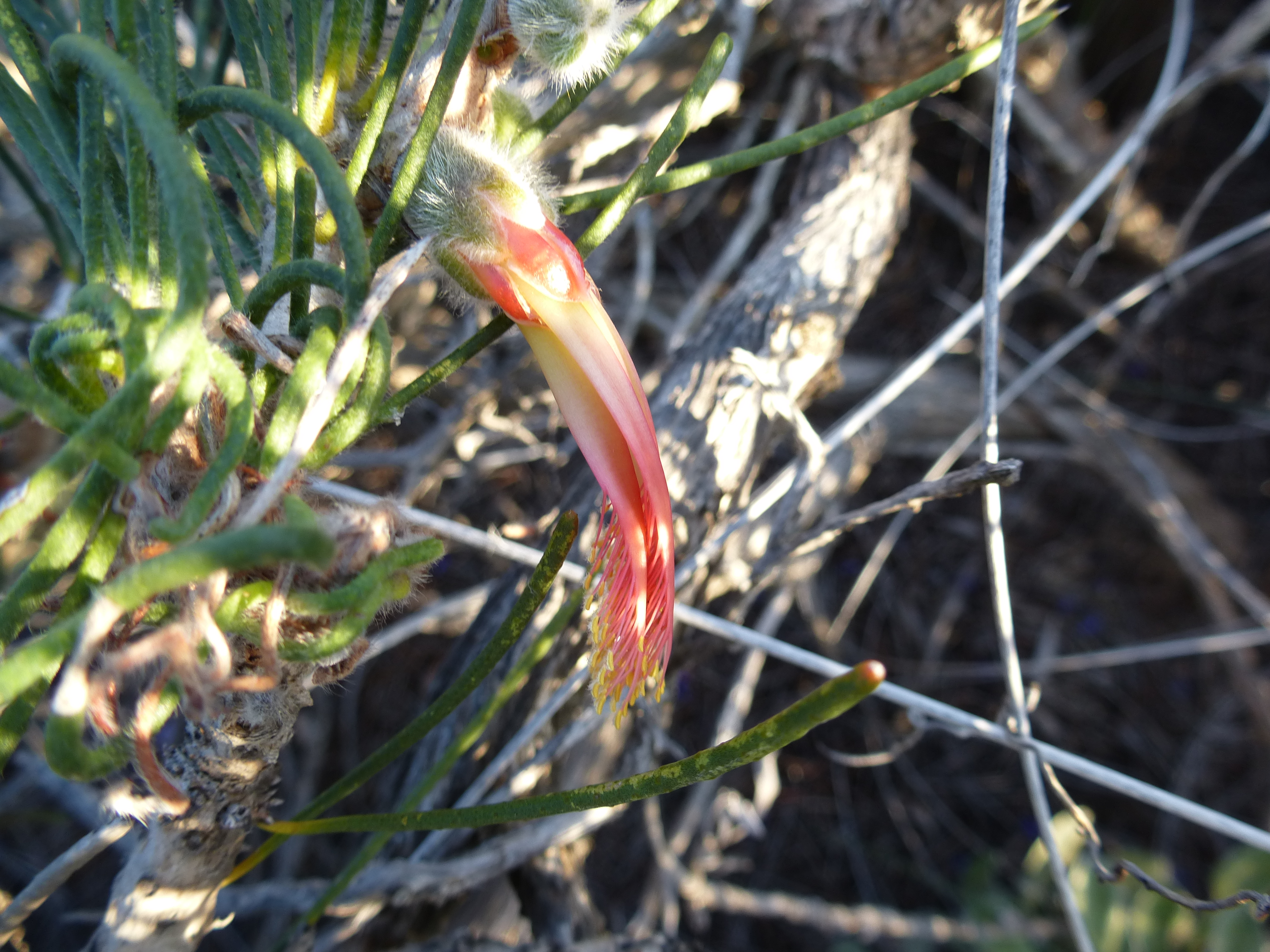
- On Red Bluff near Kalbarri

Scientific classification
- Kingdom: Plantae
- Clade: Tracheophytes
- Clade: Angiosperms
- Clade: Eudicots
- Clade: Rosids
- Order: Myrtales
- Family: Myrtaceae
- Genus: Calothamnus
- Species: C. chrysanthereus

Binomial name
- Calothamnus chrysanthereus F.Muell.

Synonyms
- Calothamnus chrysantherea F.Muell. orth. var.; Calothamnus chrysantherus F.Muell. orth. var.; Melaleuca chrysanthera Craven & R.D.Edwards orth. var.; Melaleuca chrysantherea (F.Muell.) Craven & R.D.Edwards

= Calothamnus chrysanthereus =

Species of flowering plant

Calothamnus chrysanthereus , commonly known as claw flower is a plant in the myrtle family, Myrtaceae and is endemic to the south-west of Western Australia. It is an erect shrub with needle-shaped leaves crowded on the ends of the branches and bright red flowers in spring.

== Description ==
Calothamnus chrysanthereus is an erect, dense or spreading shrub which grows to a height of about 1.5 metres (5 ft) with corky bark on the older branches. Its leaves are crowded near the ends of the branches, needle-like, mostly 50–90 millimetres (2–4 in) long and 1.0–1.4 millimetres (0.04–0.06 in) wide, circular in cross section and tapering at the end to a sharp point.

The flowers are arranged in clusters or loose spikes of up to 10, mostly on the older leafless stems. The five petals are 3–5 millimetres (0.1–0.2 in) long and papery. The stamens are bright red and arranged in 5 claw-like bundles with 24 to 28 stamens per bundle. Flowering occurs from August to December and is followed by fruits which are woody capsules, 12–15 millimetres (0.5–0.6 in) long.

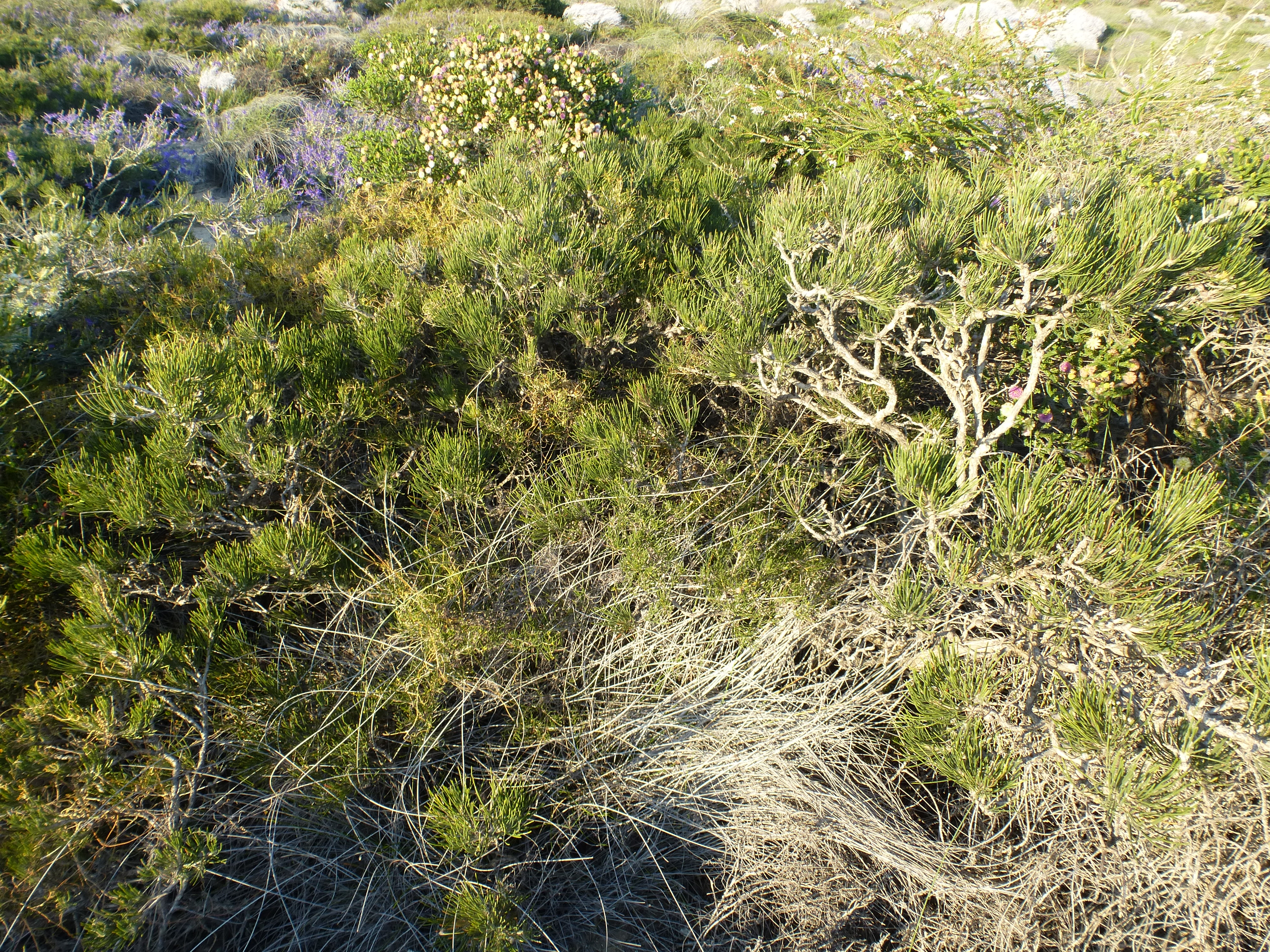
Calothamnus chrysanthereus growth habit

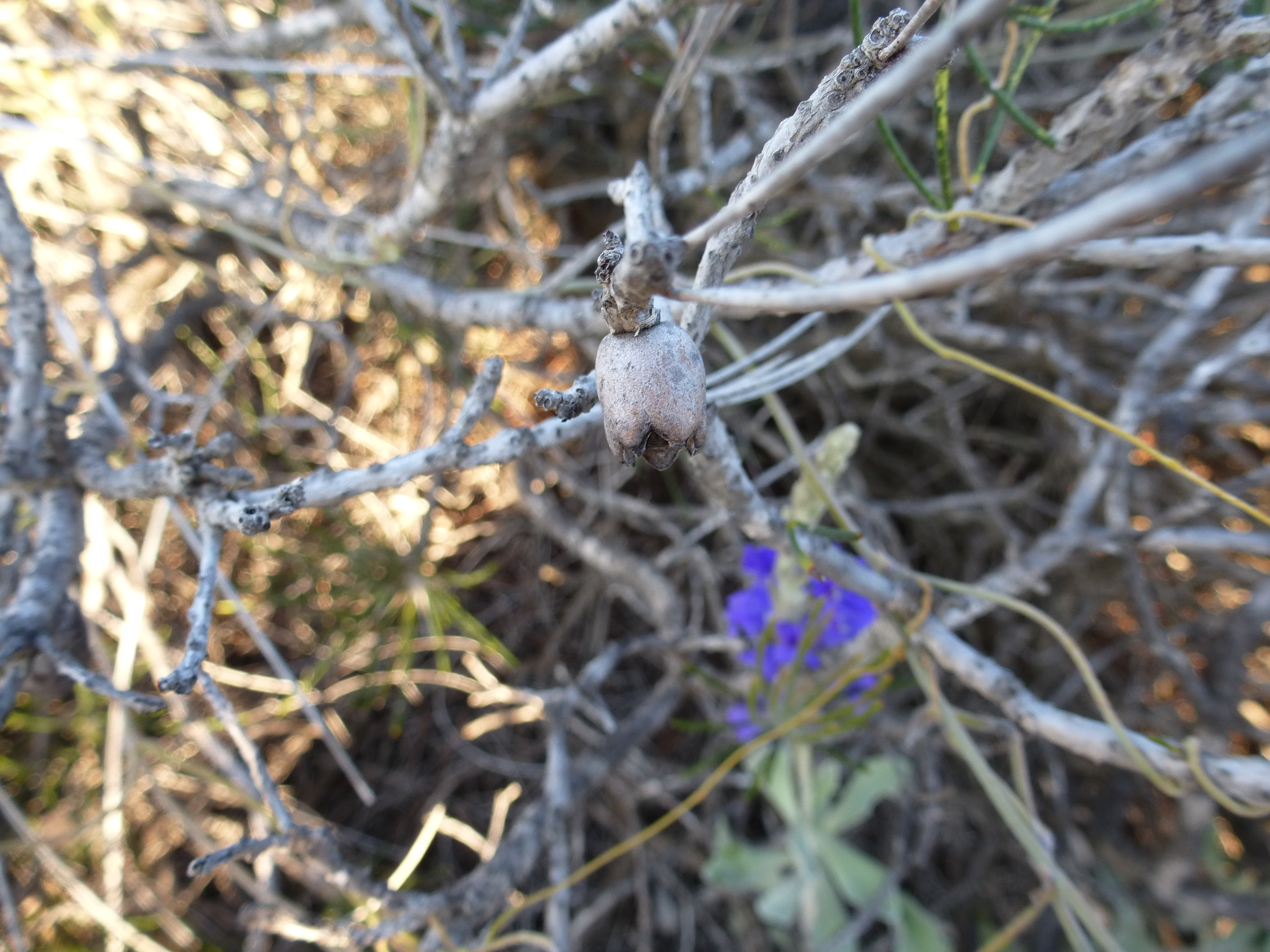
Calothamnus chrysanthereus fruiting capsule

== Taxonomy and naming ==
Claw flower was first formally described in 1862 by Ferdinand von Mueller in Fragmenta Phytographiae Australiae. In 1867, George Bentham made a complete description, giving the name Calothamnus chrysantherus. In 2010, Alex George restored the name Calothamnus chrysanthereus .

In 2014, Lyndley Craven, R.D.Edwards and Kirsten Cowley proposed that the species be renamed Melaleuca chrysantherea. That name is accepted by Plants of the World Online but not by the Australian Plant Census who list it as a synonym of Calothamnus chrysanthereus.

== Distribution and habitat ==
This calothamnus is common in the heathlands north of Geraldton in the Geraldton Sandplains and Yalgoo biogeographic regions. It grows in sandy soil in a range of situations.

== Conservation ==
Calothamnus chrysanthereus is classified as "not threatened" by the Western Australian government Department of Parks and Wildlife.
