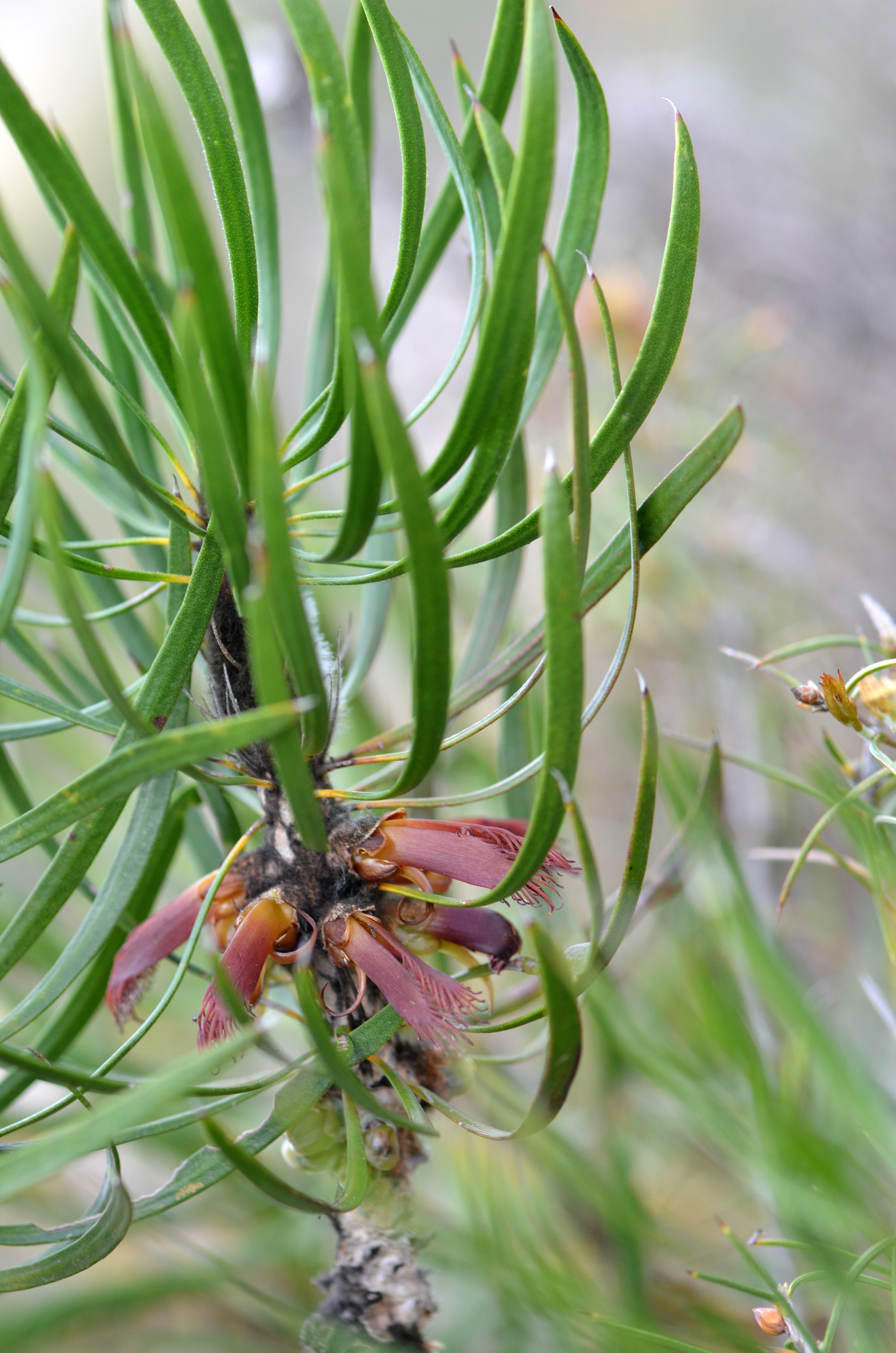

Conservation status
- Priority Four — Rare Taxa (DEC)

Scientific classification
- Kingdom: Plantae
- Clade: Tracheophytes
- Clade: Angiosperms
- Clade: Eudicots
- Clade: Rosids
- Order: Myrtales
- Family: Myrtaceae
- Genus: Calothamnus
- Species: C. pachystachyus

Binomial name
- Calothamnus pachystachyus Benth.

Synonyms
- Melaleuca pachystachya (Benth.) Craven & R.D.Edwards

= Calothamnus pachystachyus =

Species of flowering plant

Calothamnus pachystachyus is a plant in the myrtle family, Myrtaceae and is endemic to the south-west of Western Australia. It is an erect, much-branched shrub with thick bark, flat leaves and clusters of red flowers in spring. (In 2014 Craven, Edwards and Cowley proposed that the species be renamed Melaleuca pachystachya.)

== Description ==
Calothamnus pachystachyus is an erect, often straggly shrub growing to a height of 1.7 metres (6 ft). The bark is thick, corky and densely hairy. Its leaves are crowded, flat, linear, 80–150 millimetres (3–6 in) long and have a single mid-vein.

The flowers are red, black and brown and the hypanthium is buried in the corky bark at flowering time. There are 4 petals and the stamens are arranged in 4 claw-like bundles, the upper two broad and flat and the lower ones narrow and lacking anthers. Each stamen bundle contains 15 to 20 or more individual stamens. Flowering occurs between August and October and is followed by fruits which are woody capsules partly buried in the bark.

== Taxonomy and naming ==
Calothamnus pachystachyus was first formally described in 1867 by George Bentham in Flora Australiensis. The specific epithet (pachystachyus) is from the Ancient Greek words pakhús meaning "thick" and stachys meaning "a spike".

== Distribution and habitat ==
Calothamnus pachystachyus occurs near the boundary between the Avon Wheatbelt, Jarrah Forest and Swan Coastal Plain biogeographic regions where it grows soils derived from laterite on ridges and roadsides.

== Conservation status ==
Calothamnus pachystachyus is listed as "Priority Four" by the Government of Western Australia Department of Biodiversity, Conservation and Attractions, meaning that is rare or near threatened.
