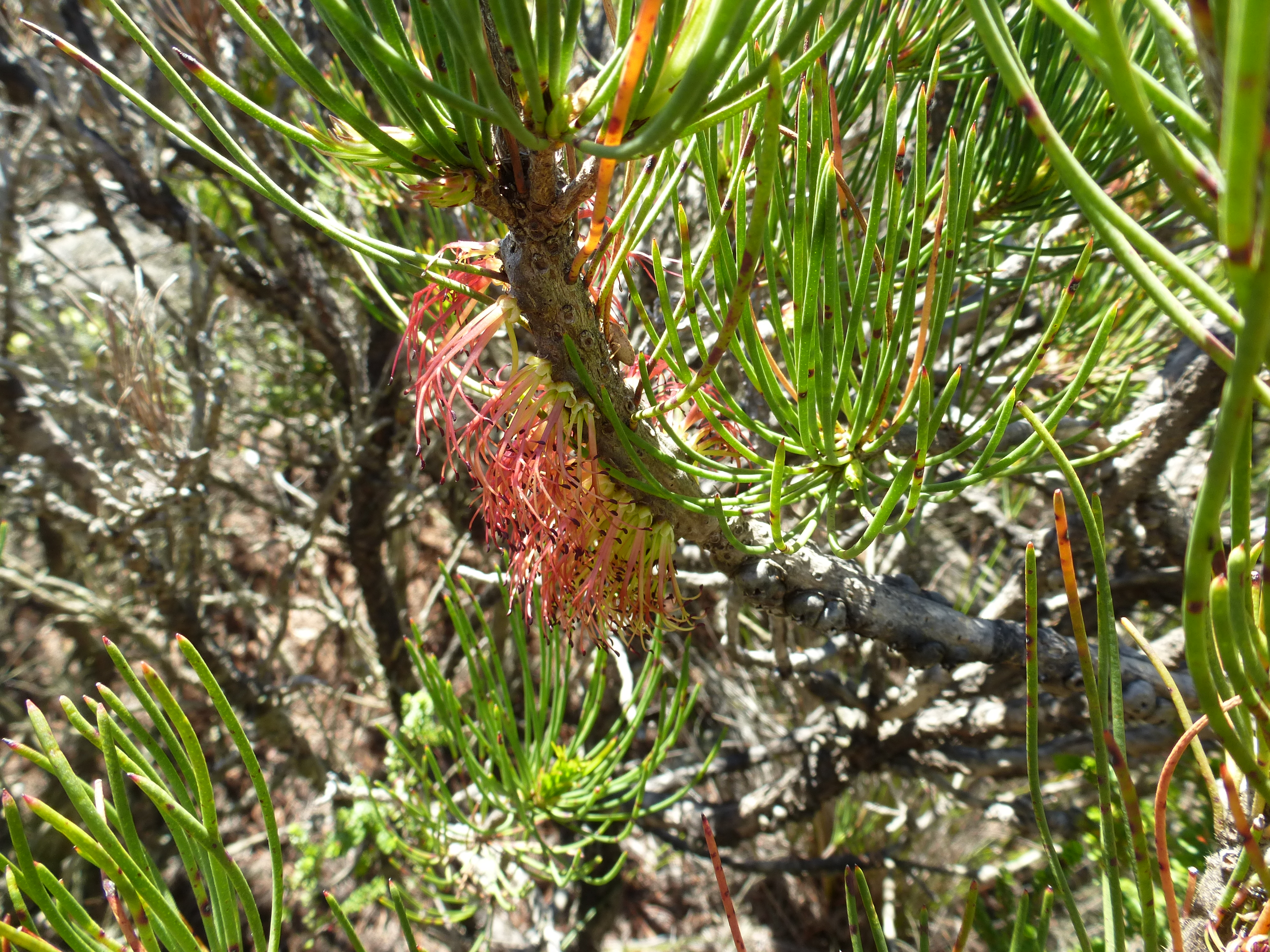
- Calothamnus montanus growing on Mount Trio

Scientific classification
- Kingdom: Plantae
- Clade: Tracheophytes
- Clade: Angiosperms
- Clade: Eudicots
- Clade: Rosids
- Order: Myrtales
- Family: Myrtaceae
- Genus: Calothamnus
- Species: C. montanus

Binomial name
- Calothamnus montanus A.S.George

Synonyms
- Melaleuca georgi Craven & R.D.Edwards

= Calothamnus montanus =

Species of flowering plant

Calothamnus montanus is a plant in the myrtle family, Myrtaceae and is endemic to the south-west of Western Australia. It is an erect shrub with short, needle-shaped leaves and red flowers with four stamen bundles. In 2014, Craven, Edwards and Cowley proposed that the species be renamed Melaleuca georgi.

== Description ==
Calothamnus montanus is a shrub growing to a height of about 2 metres (7 ft) with stems that are hairy at first but become glabrous and thick over time. Its leaves are needle-like, mostly 3.5–11 millimetres (0.1–0.4 in) long and 0.8–1.0 millimetre (0.03–0.04 in) wide and circular in cross section.

The flowers have 4 sepals and 4 petals. The stamens are partly red, partly green and are arranged in 4 claw-like bundles, each about 25–28 millimetres (0.98–1.1 in) long. The petals are 2.5–3 millimetres (0.098–0.12 in) long. Flowering occurs from October to January and is followed by fruits which are woody, flattened spherical capsules, 3–5 millimetres (0.1–0.2 in) long and partly buried in the stem.

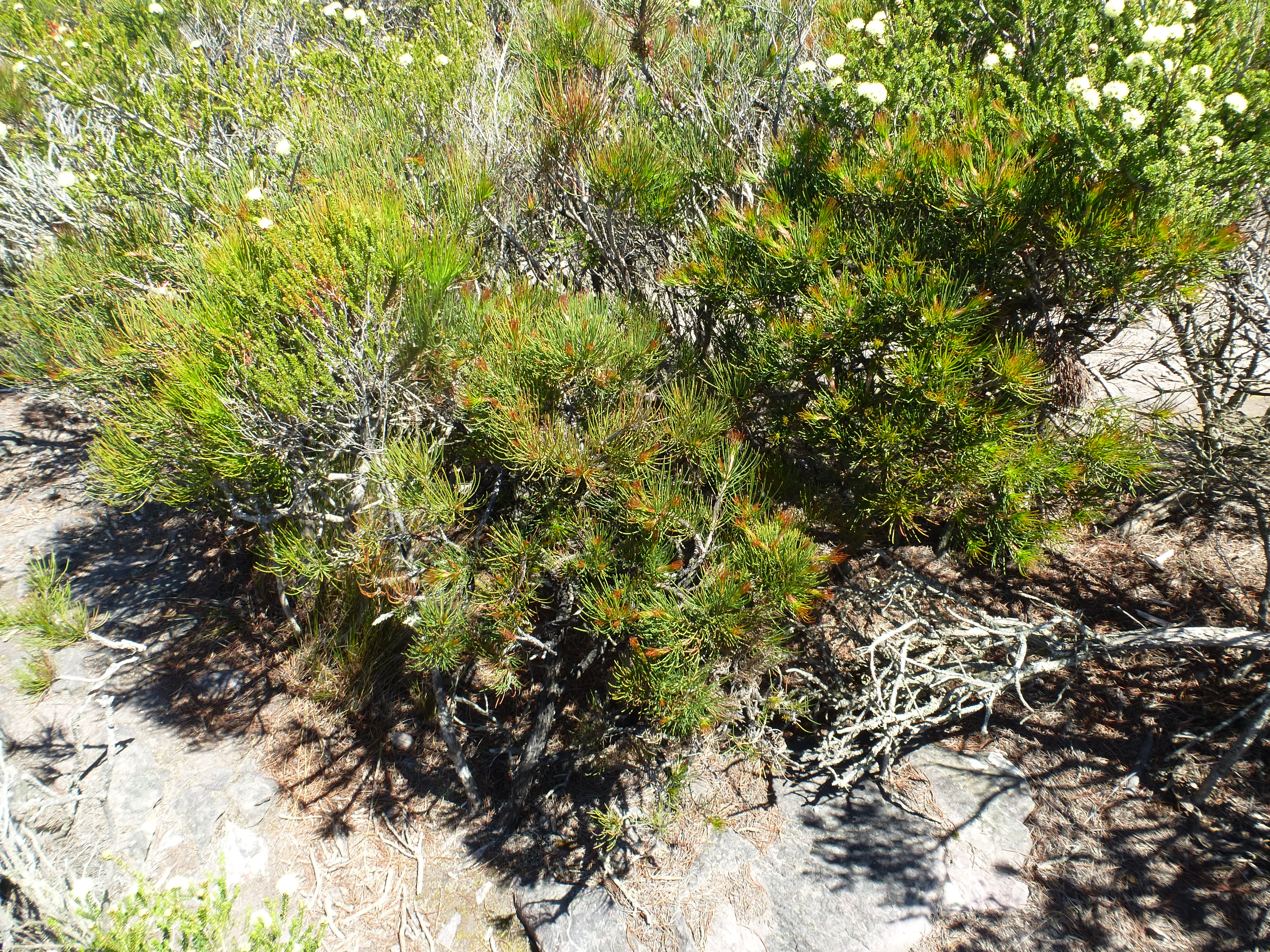
Calothamnus montanus habit

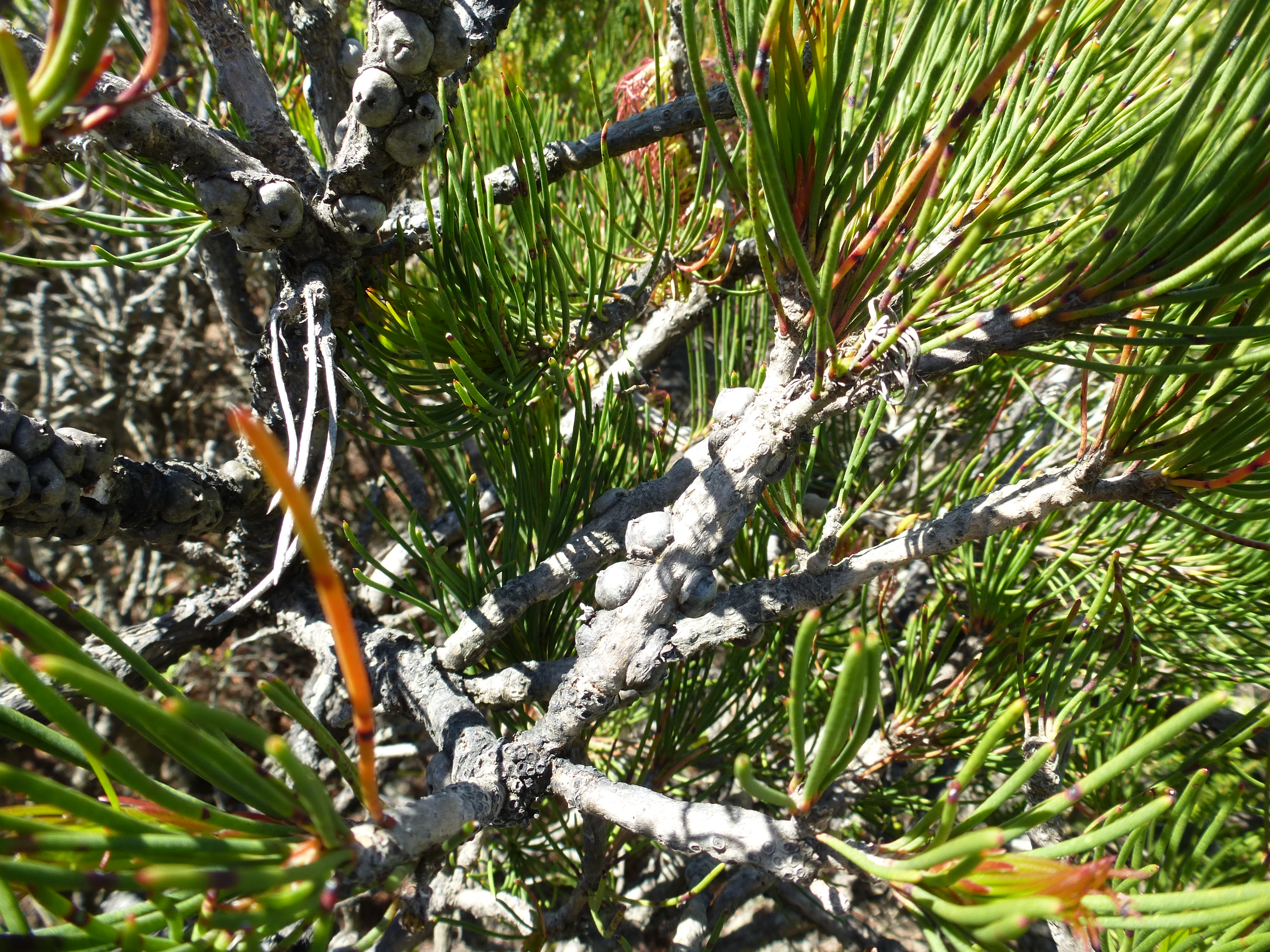
Calothamnus montanus fruits sunken in stem

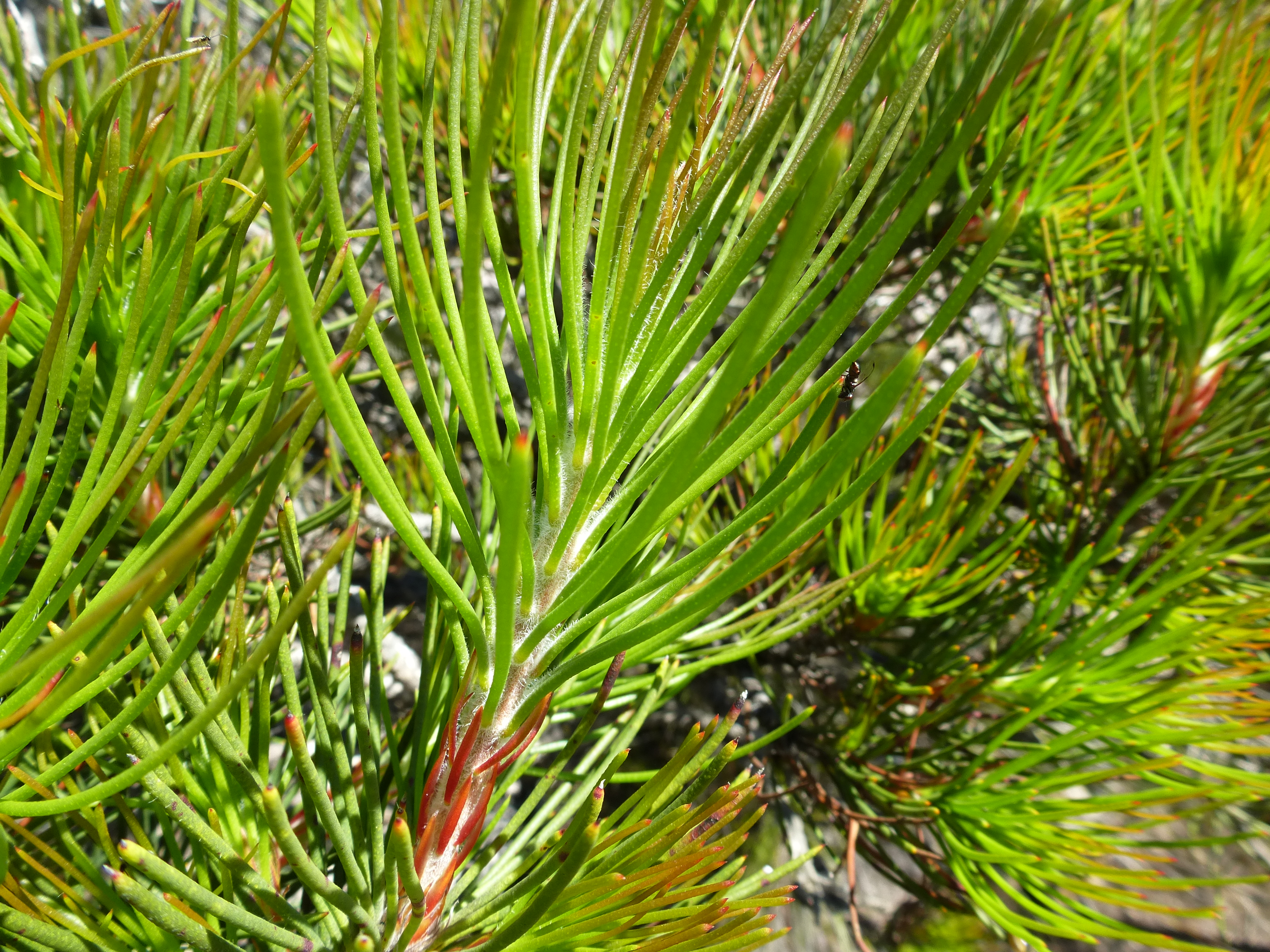
Calothamnus montanus young foliage

== Taxonomy and naming ==
Calothamnus montanus was first formally described in 2010 by Alex George from a specimen found in the Stirling Range National Park. The specific epithet (montanus) is "from the Latin montanus (montane), in reference to the occurrence".

== Distribution and habitat ==
Calothamnus montanus occurs in the Stirling Range National Park in the Esperance Plains biogeographic region where it grows in soil derived from metamorphic rocks.

== Conservation ==
Calothamnus montanus is classified as "not threatened" by the Western Australian Government Department of Parks and Wildlife.
