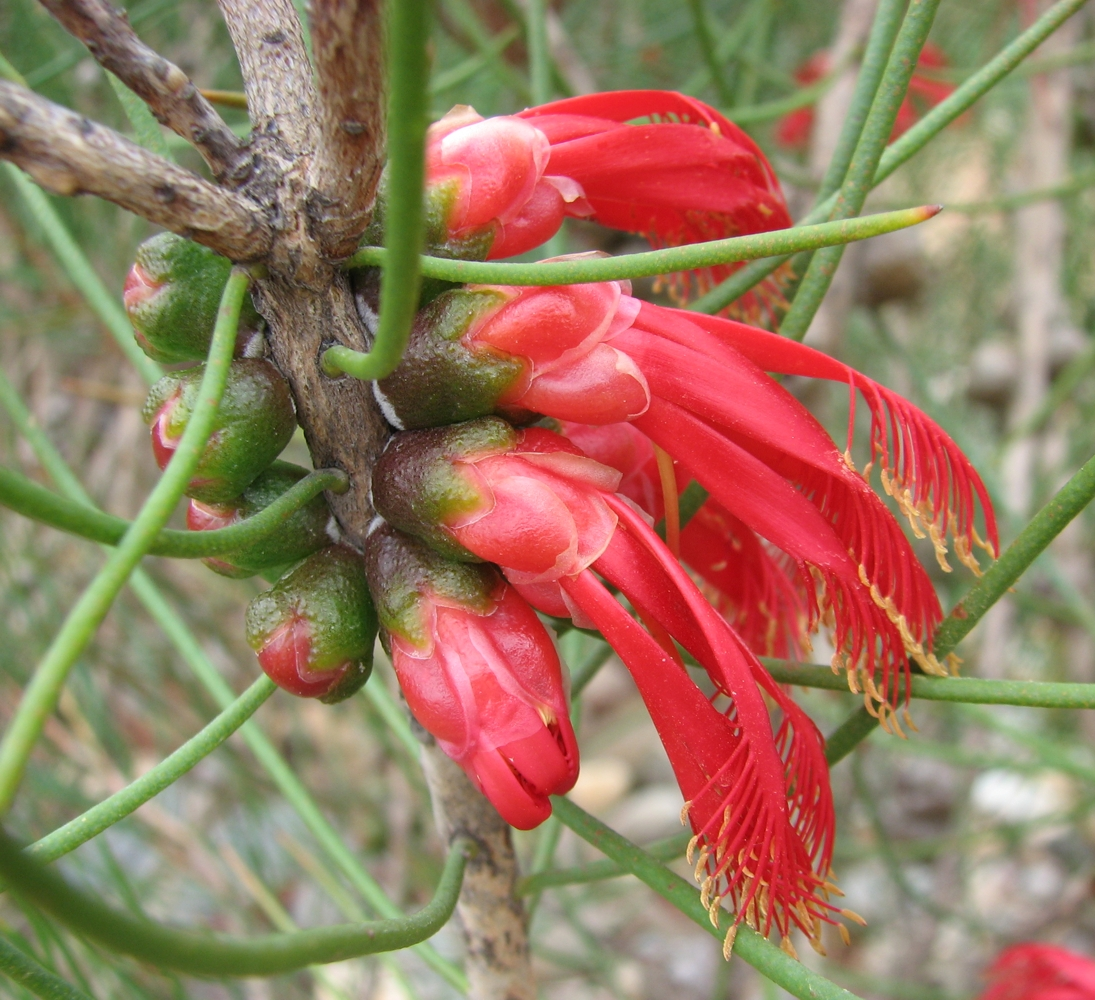
- Calothamnus gilesii in the Royal Botanic Gardens, Cranbourne

Scientific classification
- Kingdom: Plantae
- Clade: Tracheophytes
- Clade: Angiosperms
- Clade: Eudicots
- Clade: Rosids
- Order: Myrtales
- Family: Myrtaceae
- Genus: Calothamnus
- Species: C. gilesii

Binomial name
- Calothamnus gilesii F.Muell.

Synonyms
- Melaleuca gilesii (F.Muell.) Craven & R.D.Edwards

= Calothamnus gilesii =

Species of flowering plant

Calothamnus gilesii is a plant in the myrtle family, Myrtaceae and is endemic to the south-west of Western Australia. It is an erect, usually compact shrub with fine, pine-like foliage and which produces cluster of red flowers from June to January. (In 2014 Craven, Edwards and Cowley proposed that the species be renamed Melaleuca gilesii.)

== Description ==
Calothamnus gilesii is an erect, or open, spreading shrub growing to a height of about 1.5 metres (4.9 ft). Its leaves are fine, circular in cross section and up to 120 millimetres (5 in) long tapering to a sharp point.

The flowers are bright red and arranged in small groups. The stamens are arranged in 5 claw-like bundles. Flowering occurs in late spring and summer and is followed by fruits which are woody capsules.

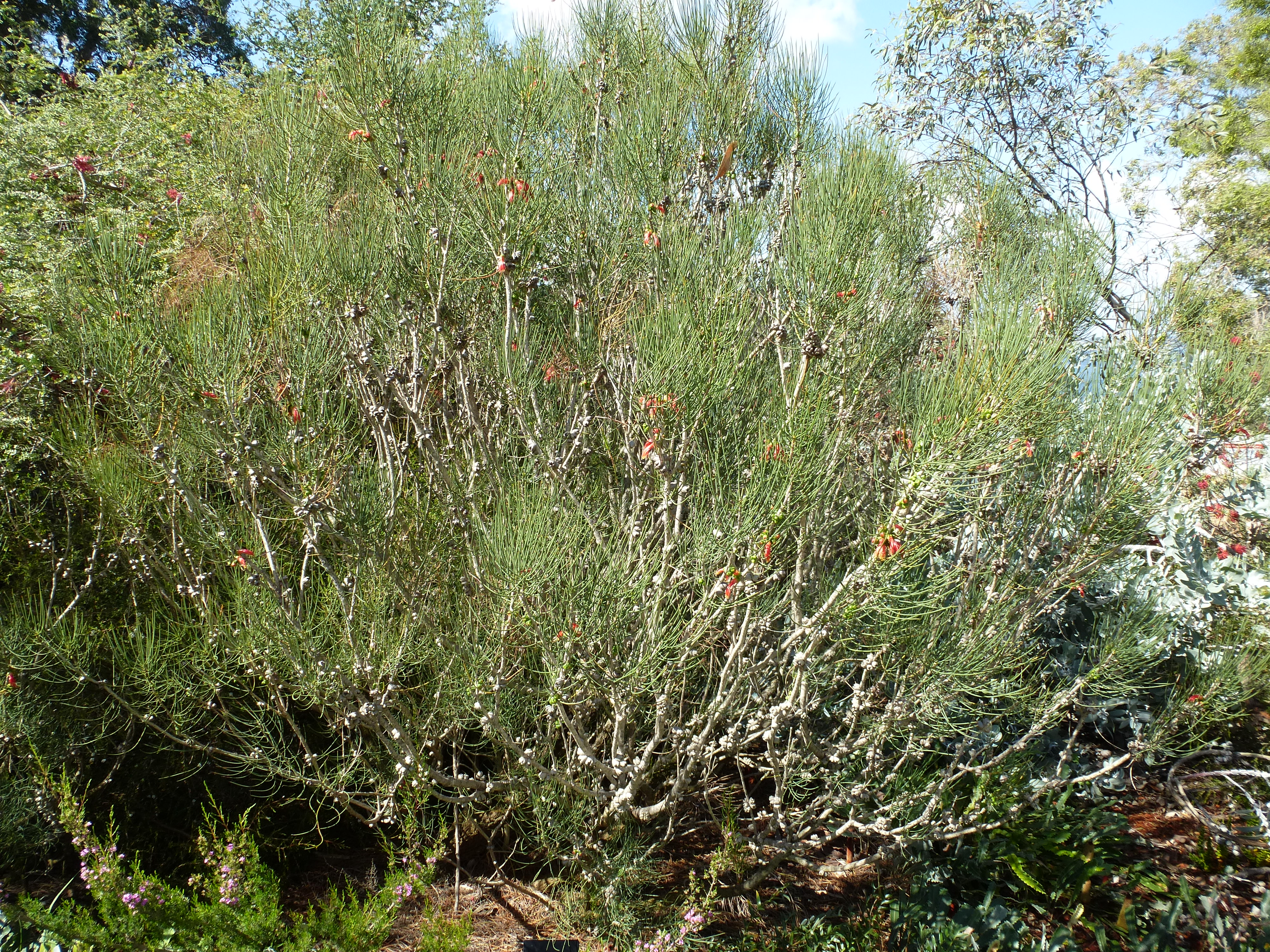
Calothamnus gilesii growth habit

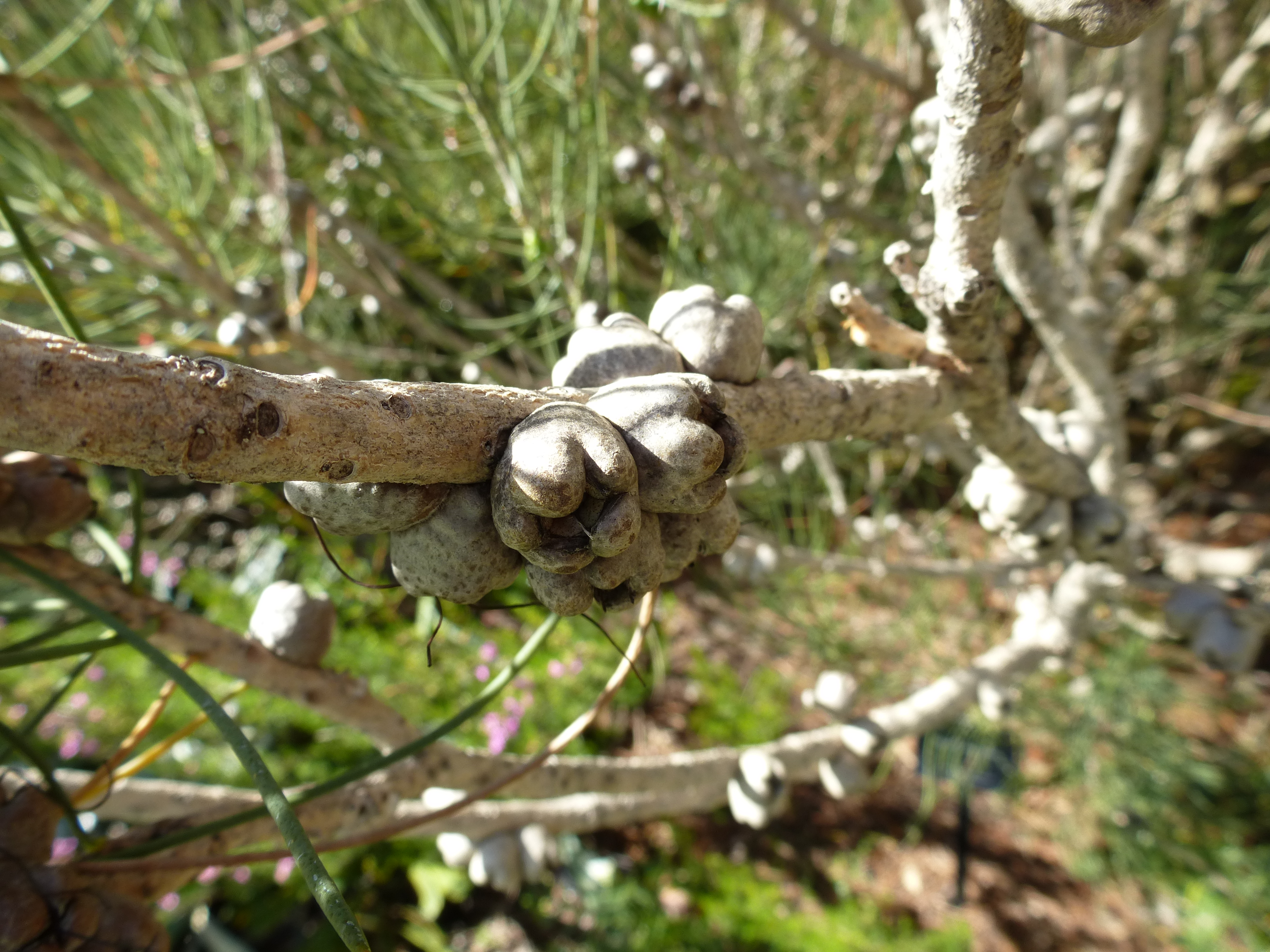
Calothamnus gilesii fruits

== Taxonomy and naming ==
Calothamnus gilesii was first formally described by Victorian Government Botanist Ferdinand von Mueller in 1876 in the tenth volume of Fragmenta Phytographiae Australiae. It is not clear whether the specific epithet (gilesii) honours Ernest Giles who conducted major expeditions in central Australia or Ernest Giles's friend, Christopher Giles, both of whom made collections for Mueller. Mueller noted that the collection was made by "Giles and Young".

== Distribution and habitat ==
Calothamnus gilesii is widespread in the drier areas of south-western Western Australia including the Avon Wheatbelt, Coolgardie, Geraldton Sandplains, Great Victoria Desert, Mallee, Murchison, Nullarbor Plain and Yalgoo biogeographic regions. It grows on sandplains and stony ridges.

== Conservation ==
This species is classified as "not threatened" by the Western Australian government department of parks and wildlife.

== Use in horticulture ==
In cultivation, the species adapts well to harsh, hot situations. It tolerates some dryness and moderate frost.
