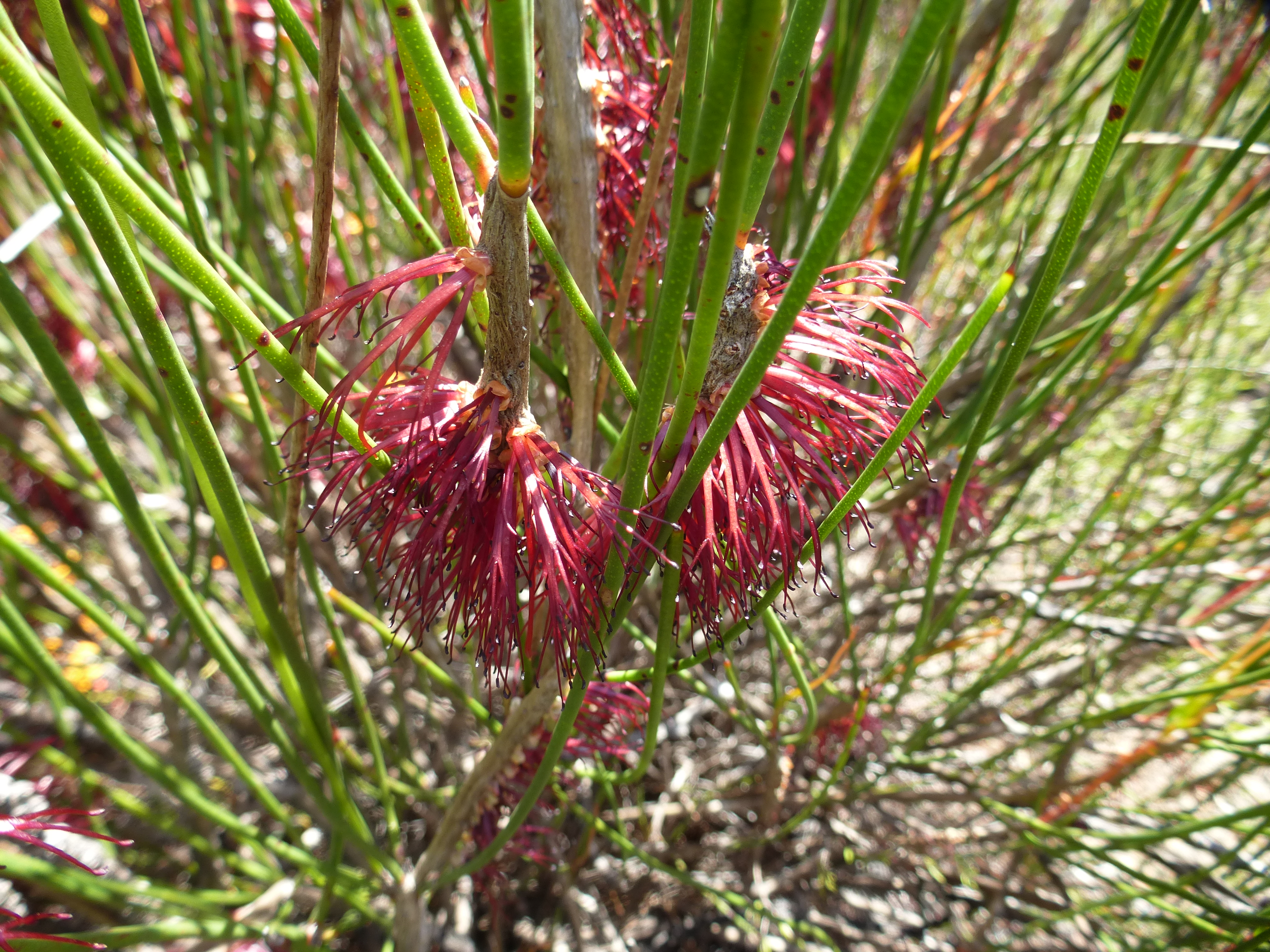
- Calothamnus longissimus growing in Manea Park, Bunbury.

Scientific classification
- Kingdom: Plantae
- Clade: Tracheophytes
- Clade: Angiosperms
- Clade: Eudicots
- Clade: Rosids
- Order: Myrtales
- Family: Myrtaceae
- Genus: Calothamnus
- Species: C. longissimus

Binomial name
- Calothamnus longissimus F.Muell.

Synonyms
- Melaleuca longissima Craven & R.D.Edwards

= Calothamnus longissimus =

Species of flowering plant

Calothamnus longissimus is a plant in the myrtle family, Myrtaceae and is endemic to the south-west of Western Australia. It is a small, spreading shrub with unusually long, fine leaves and which produces clusters of red flowers in spring. (In 2014 Craven, Edwards and Cowley proposed that the species be renamed Melaleuca longissima.)

== Description ==
Calothamnus longissimus is an erect, stiff, dense or spreading shrub growing to a height of about 1.5 metres (4.9 ft) with many branches and corky bark. Its leaves are fine but rigid, mostly circular in cross section, 150–300 millimetres (6–10 in) long and curved.

The flowers are dark red and arranged in small spikes with the lower part of the flower embedded in the corky bark. The stamens are arranged in 4 claw-like bundles of unequal lengths - the upper two are longer and broader and the lower two lacking anthers. Flowering occurs in August to October and is followed by fruits which are woody capsules almost immersed in the corky bark.

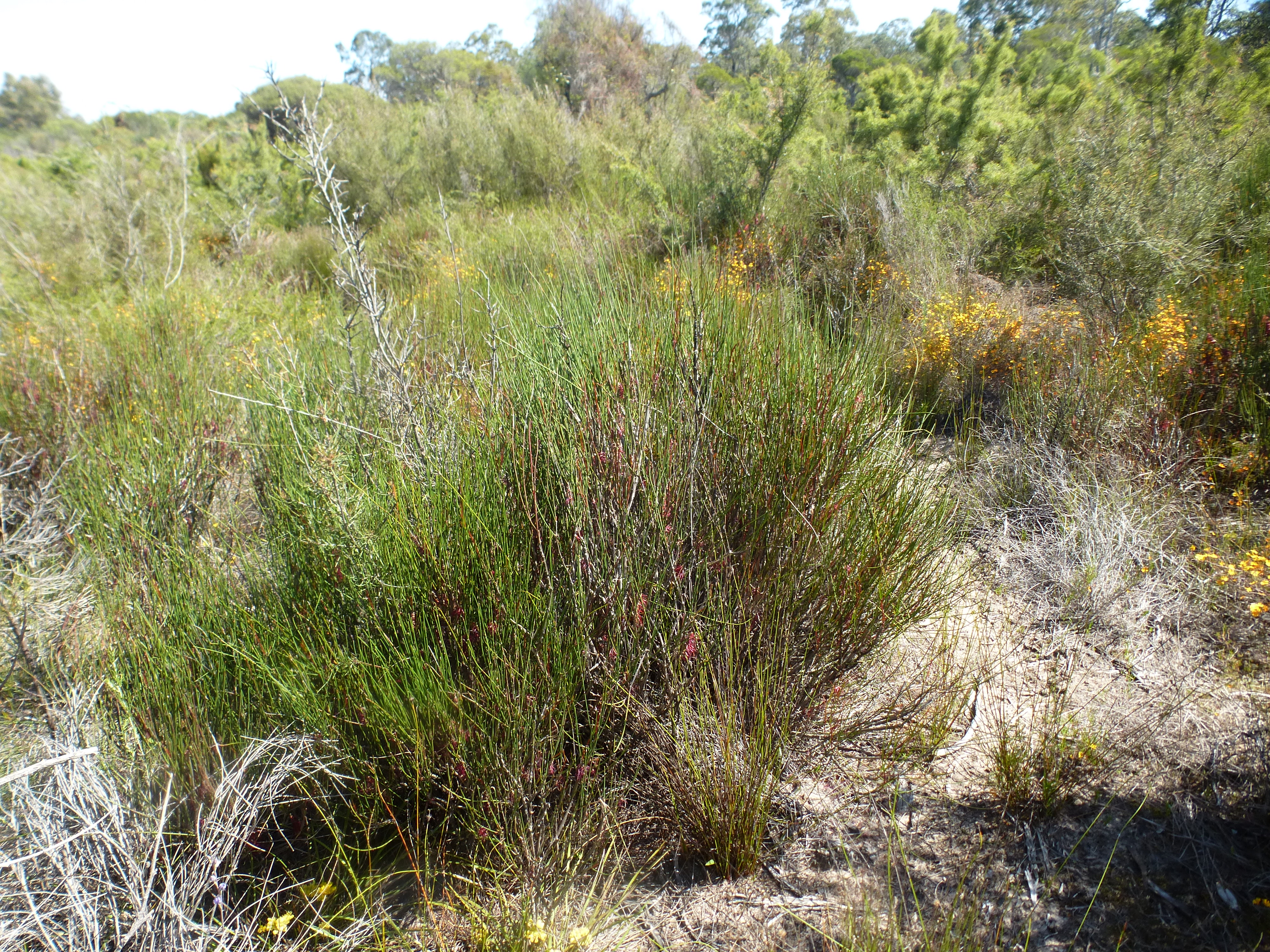
Calothamnus longissimus growth habit

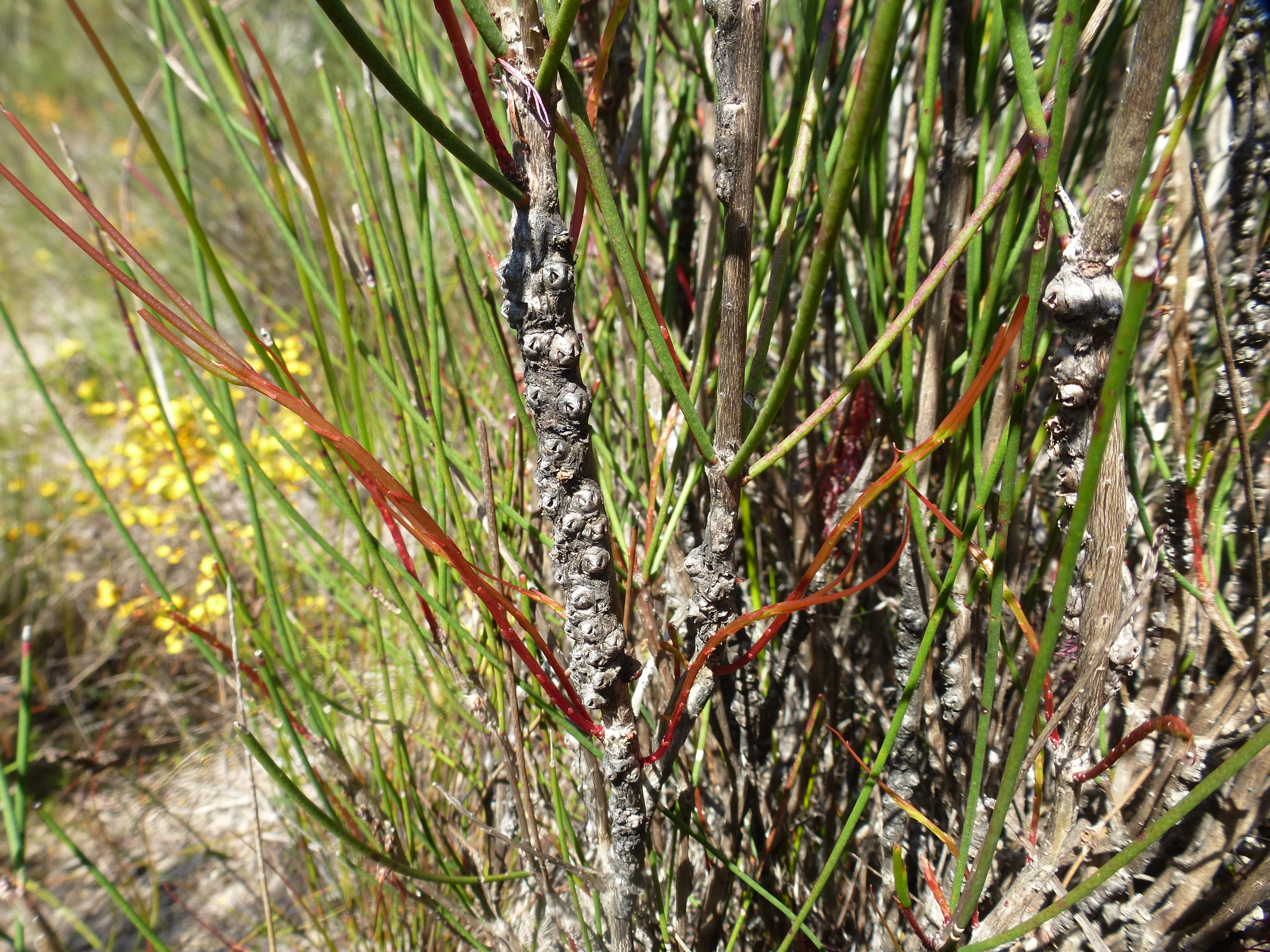
Calothamnus longissimus fruits

== Taxonomy and naming ==
Calothamnus longissimus was first formally described by Victorian Government Botanist Ferdinand von Mueller in 1862 in the third volume (part 21) of Fragmenta Phytographiae Australiae. The specific epithet (longissimus) is a Latin word meaning "longest".

== Distribution and habitat ==
Calothamnus longissimus is found in the Avon Wheatbelt, Geraldton Sandplains and Swan Coastal Plain biogeographic regions where it grows in kwongan.

== Conservation ==
Calothamnus longissimus is classified as "not threatened" by the Western Australian government department of parks and wildlife.
