= Calothamnus cupularis =

Conservation status
- Priority Two — Poorly Known Taxa (DEC)

Scientific classification
- Kingdom: Plantae
- Clade: Tracheophytes
- Clade: Angiosperms
- Clade: Eudicots
- Clade: Rosids
- Order: Myrtales
- Family: Myrtaceae
- Genus: Calothamnus
- Species: C. cupularis

Binomial name
- Calothamnus cupularis A.S.George

Synonyms
- Melaleuca arcuata (A.S.George) Craven & R.D.Edwards

Species of flowering plant

Calothamnus cupularis is a plant in the myrtle family, Myrtaceae and is endemic to the south-west of Western Australia. (In 2014 Craven, Edwards and Cowley proposed that the species be renamed Melaleuca arcuata.) It is a similar shrub to Calothamnus formosus but has larger flowers and fruit.

== Description ==
Calothamnus cupularis is a shrub growing to a height of about 1.2 metres (4 ft) with stems that are hairy at first but become glabrous over time. Its leaves are needle-like, mostly 40–100 millimetres (2–4 in) long and 1.0–1.3 millimetres (0.04–0.05 in) wide, circular in cross section and tapering at the end to a sharp point.

The flowers are bright red and have 5 petals and 5 claw-like bundles of stamens, each about 35–38 millimetres (1.4–1.5 in) long. The sepals have a thickened rib in their centre and wide papery margins. The petals are 7–8 millimetres (0.28–0.31 in) long. Flowering occurs in September or October and is followed by fruits which are woody, smooth, cylindrical capsules, 12–14 millimetres (0.47–0.55 in) long.

== Taxonomy and naming ==
Calothamnus cupularis was first formally described in 2010 by Alex George from a specimen found in the Kalbarri National Park. The specific epithet (cupularis) is Latin for "cup-like", referring to the shape of the fruits of this species.

== Distribution and habitat ==
Calothamnus cupularis occurs in a small area in the Kalbarri National Park, in the Geraldton Sandplains biogeographic region where it grows in sand in kwongan.

== Conservation ==
Calothamnus cupularis is classified as "priority 2" by the Western Australian government Department of Parks and Wildlife meaning that is poorly known and from one or a few locations.
