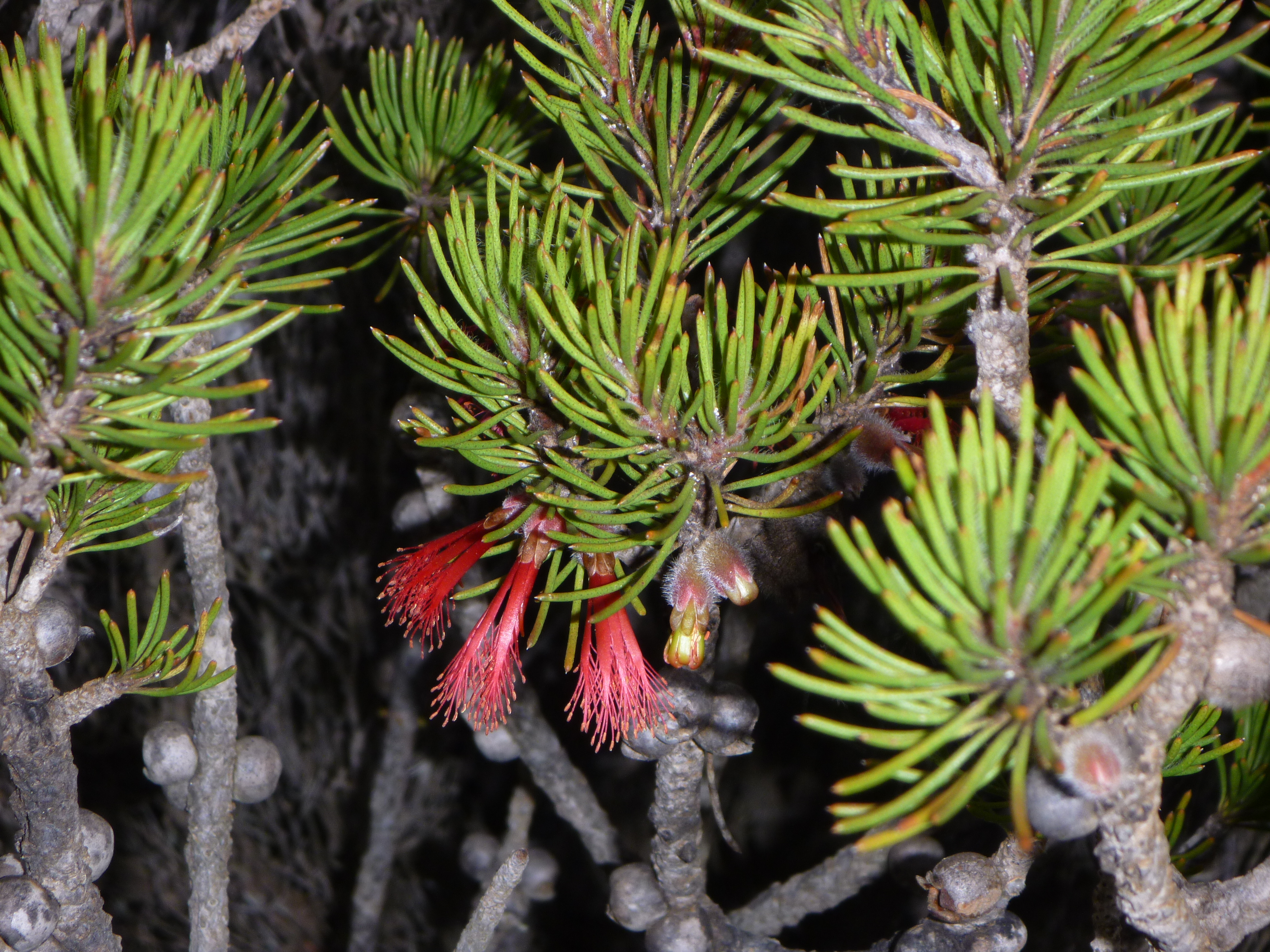
- Calothamnus robustus at Cape Riche

Conservation status
- Priority Three — Poorly Known Taxa (DEC)

Scientific classification
- Kingdom: Plantae
- Clade: Tracheophytes
- Clade: Angiosperms
- Clade: Eudicots
- Clade: Rosids
- Order: Myrtales
- Family: Myrtaceae
- Genus: Calothamnus
- Species: C. robustus

Binomial name
- Calothamnus robustus Schauer

Synonyms
- Melaleuca robusta (Schauer) Craven & R.D.Edwards

= Calothamnus robustus =

Species of flowering plant

Calothamnus robustus is a plant in the myrtle family, Myrtaceae and is endemic to the south-west of Western Australia. It is an erect shrub with cylindrical leaves and small clusters of red flowers in spring, followed by fruits with have two prominent lobes.

== Description ==
Calothamnus robustus is a compact, erect shrub growing to about 0.5–1.5 metres (1.6–4.9 ft) tall. Its leaves are circular in cross section but are not prickly.

The flowers are red and arranged in clusters of 3 to 5. Unlike some others in the genus, the flowers and fruit are never buried in corky bark. The flowers have 4 sepals which are densely hairy on their outer surface. There are 4 petals and the stamens are joined in 4 narrow, claw-like bundles which are all roughly the same length. Flowering occurs mainly from September to November, sometimes in other months and is followed by fruits which are woody capsules. The fruiting capsules have two prominently thickened lobes.

== Taxonomy and naming ==
Calothamnus robustus was first formally described by Johannes Schauer in 1843 in Dissertatio phytographica de Regelia, Beaufortia et Calothamno from a specimen collected in the foothills of Mount Melville near Cape Riche. The specific epithet is a Latin word meaning "hard and strong like oak".

== Distribution and habitat ==
Calothamnus robustus occurs near Albany in the Esperance Plains biogeographic region growing in rocky soils derived from quartzite or granite.

== Conservation ==
Calothamnus robustus is classified as "Priority Three" by the Western Australian government department of parks and wildlife meaning that it is poorly known and known from only a few locations but is not under imminent threat.
