= Calothamnus scabridus =

Conservation status
- Priority Two — Poorly Known Taxa (DEC)

Scientific classification
- Kingdom: Plantae
- Clade: Tracheophytes
- Clade: Angiosperms
- Clade: Eudicots
- Clade: Rosids
- Order: Myrtales
- Family: Myrtaceae
- Genus: Calothamnus
- Species: C. scabridus

Binomial name
- Calothamnus scabridus A.S.George

Synonyms
- Melaleuca scabrida (A.S.George) Craven & R.D.Edwards

Species of flowering plant

Calothamnus scabridus is a plant in the myrtle family, Myrtaceae and is endemic to the south-west of Western Australia. It is a shrub with needle-shaped, prickly leaves and red flowers with four stamen bundles. (In 2014 Craven, Edwards and Cowley proposed that the species be renamed Melaleuca rosea.)

== Description ==
Calothamnus scabridus is an erect shrub growing to a height of about 1.5 metres (5 ft). Its leaves are needle-like, mostly 20–70 millimetres (0.8–3 in) long and 0.8–1.0 millimetre (0.03–0.04 in) wide, have a rough surface, are circular in cross section and taper to a sharp, prickly point.

The flowers have 4 sepals and 4 petals and are in small groups between the older leaves or on old leafless wood. The flower cup (the hypanthium) is at least partly buried in the corky bark. The stamens are a shade of pink to bright red and are arranged in 4 claw-like bundles, each about 23–28 millimetres (0.9–1 in) long. The petals are 6–7 millimetres (0.2–0.3 in) long. Flowering occurs from October to December and is followed by fruits which are smooth, woody, roughly spherical capsules, 3–4 millimetres (0.1–0.2 in) long.

== Taxonomy and naming ==
Calothamnus scabridus was first formally described in 2010 by Alex George in Nuytsia from a specimen found near Manjimup. The specific epithet (scabridus) is a reference to the rough surface of the leaves.

== Distribution and habitat ==
Calothamnus scabridus occurs north of Denmark in the Jarrah Forest biogeographic region where it grows in loamy soil derived from granite.

== Conservation ==
Calothamnus scabridus is classified as "Priority Two" by the Western Australian government department of parks and wildlife meaning that it is poorly known from a few locations, some of which are in reserves.
