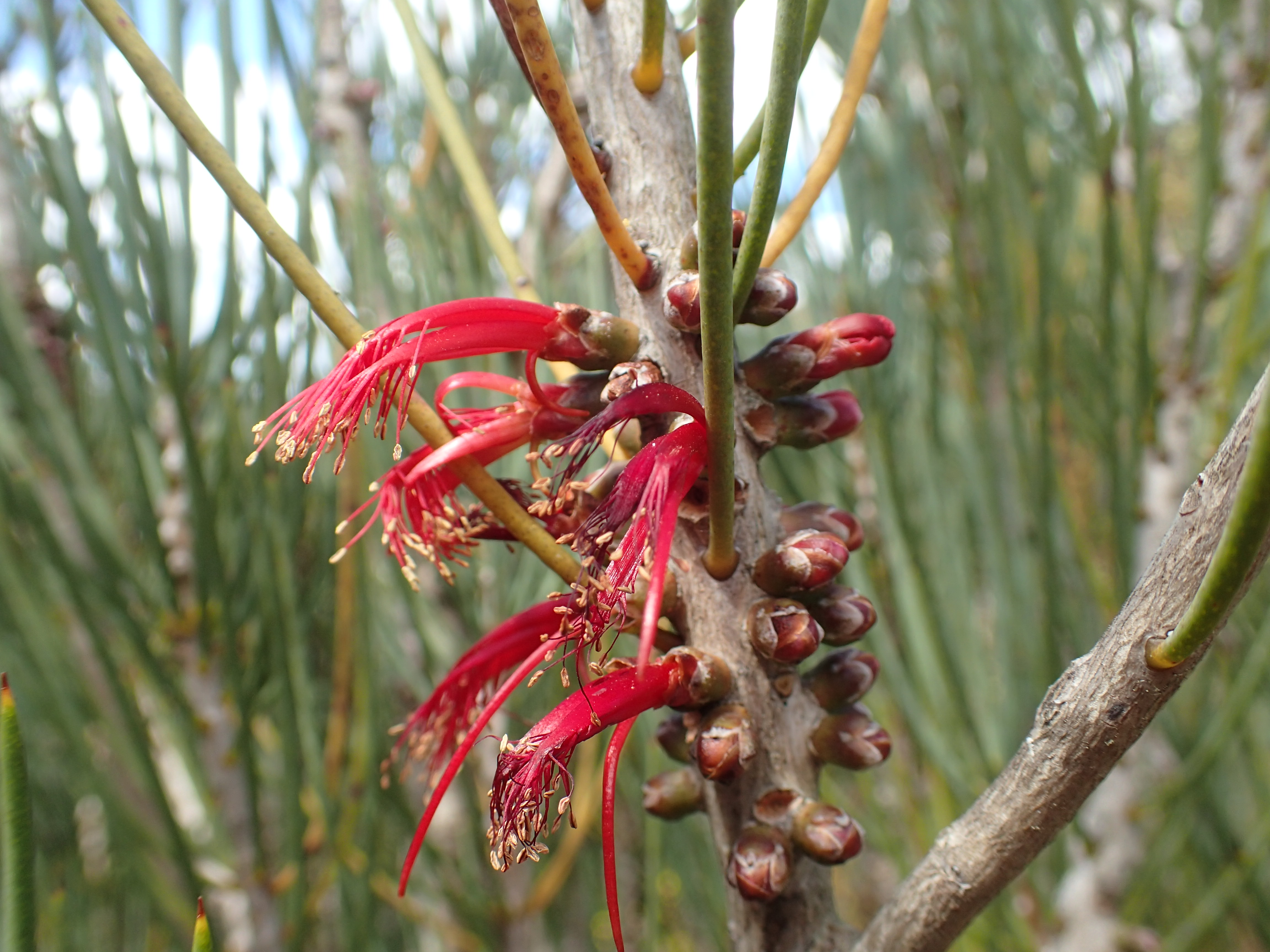
- In the Australian National Botanic Gardens

Scientific classification
- Kingdom: Plantae
- Clade: Tracheophytes
- Clade: Angiosperms
- Clade: Eudicots
- Clade: Rosids
- Order: Myrtales
- Family: Myrtaceae
- Genus: Calothamnus
- Species: C. tuberosus

Binomial name
- Calothamnus tuberosus Hawkeswood

Synonyms
- Melaleuca tuberosa (Hawkeswood) Craven & R.D.Edwards

= Calothamnus tuberosus =

Species of flowering plant

Calothamnus tuberosus is a plant in the myrtle family, Myrtaceae and is endemic to the south-west of Western Australia. It is a stiff, prickly plant with cylindrical leaves and red flowers, growing near or often on granite boulders. It has a lignotuber and tuberous roots. (In 2014 Craven, Edwards and Cowley proposed that the species be renamed Melaleuca tuberosa.)

== Description ==
Calothamnus tuberosus is a compact, highly branched shrub growing to a height of about 2.5 metres (8 ft) or more. Its leaves are crowded at the ends of the branches and are 50–80 millimetres (2–3 in) long, 1.0–2.5 millimetres (0.04–0.1 in) in diameter, stiff, cylindrical in shape and taper to a prickly point.

The flowers are rich red and in small dense spikes amongst the leaves or on the older, leafless branches . The 4 petals are 3–4 millimetres (0.1–0.2 in) long, thin, papery and orange to brown. The stamens are arranged in 4 claw-like bundles, all 22–28 millimetres (0.9–1 in)usually with 12 to 16 stamens per bundle. Flowering occurs from November to January, although sometimes in other months, depending on weather conditions. Flowering is followed by fruits which are woody, almost spherical capsules, 4–5 millimetres (0.16–0.20 in) in diameter.

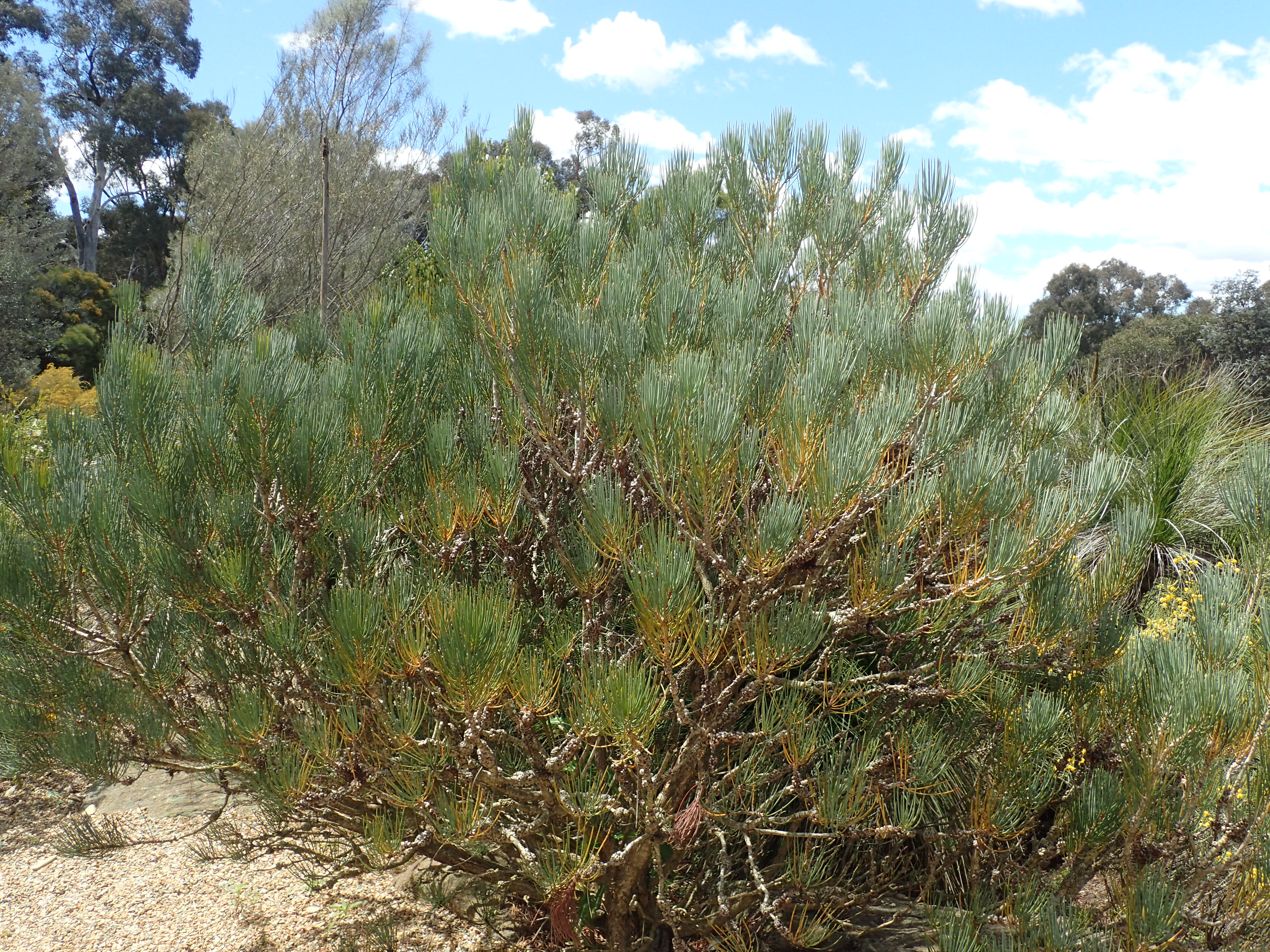
Habit (labelled) in the ANBG

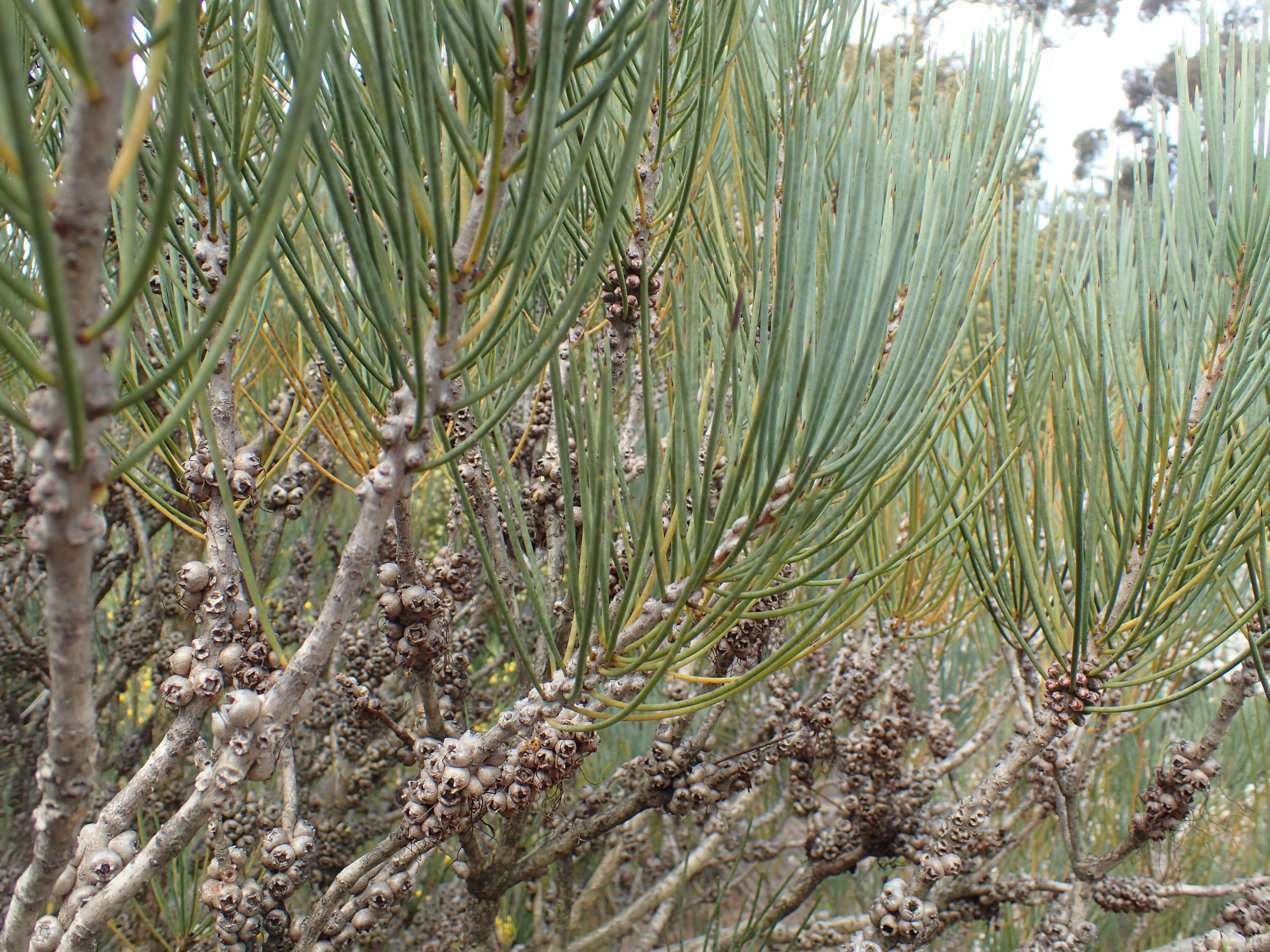
Foliage and fruit

== Taxonomy and naming ==
Calothamnus tuberosus was first formally described in 1984 by Trevor Hawkeswood in the botanical journal Nuytsia. The specific epithet (tuberosus) is a Latin word meaning "full of lumps".

== Distribution and habitat ==
Calothamnus tuberosus occurs on or close to rocky granite outcrops from the Barbalin area to Peak Charles in the Avon Wheatbelt, Coolgardie, Esperance Plains and Mallee biogeographic regions.

== Conservation ==
Calothamnus tuberosus is classified as "not threatened" by the Western Australian Government Department of Parks and Wildlife.
