= Calothamnus schaueri =

Scientific classification
- Kingdom: Plantae
- Clade: Tracheophytes
- Clade: Angiosperms
- Clade: Eudicots
- Clade: Rosids
- Order: Myrtales
- Family: Myrtaceae
- Genus: Calothamnus
- Species: C. schaueri

Binomial name
- Calothamnus schaueri Lehm.

Synonyms
- Melaleuca schaueri (Lehm.) Craven & R.D.Edwards

Species of flowering plant

Calothamnus schaueri is a plant in the myrtle family, Myrtaceae and is endemic to the south-west of Western Australia. It is a small, spreading, sometimes prostrate shrub, growing to a height of about 0.6 metres (2 ft) with cylindrical leaves 100–200 millimetres (4–8 in) long. It has brownish red flowers from August to December. The flowers have 4 petals and 4 narrow bundles of stamens. (In 2014 Craven, Edwards and Cowley proposed that the species be renamed Melaleuca planifolia.)

Calothamnus schaueri was first formally described by Johann Lehmmann in 1842 in Delectus Seminum quae in Horto Hamburgensium botanico e collectione. The specific epithet (schaueri) honours Johannes Schauer.

Calothamnus schaueri occurs near Albany in the Esperance Plains, Jarrah Forest and Warren biogeographic regions where it grows in swamps near granite outcrops.

Calothamnus schaueri is classified as "not threatened" by the Western Australian government department of parks and wildlife.
