= Calothamnus roseus =

Conservation status
- Priority One — Poorly Known Taxa (DEC)

Scientific classification
- Kingdom: Plantae
- Clade: Tracheophytes
- Clade: Angiosperms
- Clade: Eudicots
- Clade: Rosids
- Order: Myrtales
- Family: Myrtaceae
- Genus: Calothamnus
- Species: C. roseus

Binomial name
- Calothamnus roseus A.S.George

Synonyms
- Melaleuca rosea (A.S.George) Craven & R.D.Edwards

Species of flowering plant

Calothamnus roseus is a plant in the myrtle family, Myrtaceae and is endemic to the south-west of Western Australia. It is a shrub with needle-shaped, prickly leaves and pink flowers with four stamen bundles. (In 2014 Craven, Edwards and Cowley proposed that the species be renamed Melaleuca rosea.)

== Description ==
Calothamnus roseus is a shrub growing to a height of about 2.5 metres (8 ft). Its leaves are needle-like, mostly 25–45 millimetres (1–2 in) long and 0.5–0.7 millimetres (0.02–0.03 in) wide, circular in cross section and tapering to a sharp, prickly point.

The flowers have 4 sepals and 4 petals. The flower cup (the hypanthium) and the sepals are hairy. The stamens are deep pink and are arranged in 4 claw-like bundles, each about 28–33 millimetres (1.1–1.3 in) long. The petals are 6–7 millimetres (0.24–0.28 in) long. Flowering occurs from September to November and is followed by fruits which are smooth, woody capsules, 13–16 millimetres (0.5–0.6 in) long.

== Taxonomy and naming ==
Calothamnus roseus was first formally described in 2010 by Alex George in Nuytsia from a specimen found near Ravensthorpe. The Latin roseus (rose-pink) refers to the colour of the stamens.

== Distribution and habitat ==
Calothamnus roseus occurs near Ravensthorpe in the Esperance Plains biogeographic region, where it grows in rocky soil derived from quartzite.

== Conservation ==
Calothamnus roseus is classified as "Priority One" by the Western Australian Government Department of Parks and Wildlife, meaning that it is known from only one or a few locations which are potentially at risk.
