= Calothamnus superbus =

Conservation status
- Priority One — Poorly Known Taxa (DEC)

Scientific classification
- Kingdom: Plantae
- Clade: Tracheophytes
- Clade: Angiosperms
- Clade: Eudicots
- Clade: Rosids
- Order: Myrtales
- Family: Myrtaceae
- Genus: Calothamnus
- Species: C. superbus

Binomial name
- Calothamnus superbus Hawkeswood & Mollemans

Synonyms
- Melaleuca superba (Hawkeswood & Mollemans) Craven & R.D.Edwards

Species of flowering plant

Calothamnus superbus is a plant in the myrtle family, Myrtaceae and is endemic to the south-west of Western Australia. It is an erect, often spreading, straggly shrub similar to Calothamnus aridus with its red flowers having 5 stamen bundles, but its leaves are longer and wider. It has a limited distribution near Pigeon Rocks south of Lake Barlee. (In 2014 Craven, Edwards and Cowley proposed that the species be renamed Melaleuca superba.)

== Description ==
Calothamnus superbus is an erect spreading shrub with many branches growing to a height of about 2.5 metres (8 ft). Its leaves are mostly 130–150 millimetres (5–6 in) long, 1.2–1.6 millimetres (0.05–0.06 in) in diameter, linear, circular in cross section and taper to a sharp point. There are prominent oil glands on the leaves.

The flowers are red and arranged in small clusters of about 3 or about 10 in a loose spike between the leaves on the younger branches. The petals are 3–5 millimetres (0.1–0.2 in) long, thin, papery and orange to brown. The stamens are arranged in 5 claw-like bundles usually with 12 to 17 stamens per bundle. Flowering probably occurs in response to rainfall and is followed by fruits which are woody capsules, 5–7 millimetres (0.2–0.3 in) long and 7–9 millimetres (0.3–0.4 in) in diameter.

== Taxonomy and naming ==
Calothamnus superbus was first formally described in 1992 by Trevor Hawkeswood and Frans Mollemans in the botanical journal Nuytsia. The specific epithet (superbus) is a Latin word meaning "excellent, superior or splendid", and refers to the distinctive colour of the foliage and it prominence in the area in which it occurs.

== Distribution and habitat ==
Calothamnus superbus occurs in the Pigeon Rocks area in the Coolgardie biogeographic region where it grows in pebbly sand on sandplains.

== Conservation ==
Calothamnus superbus is classified as "Priority One" by the Western Australian Government Department of Parks and Wildlife, meaning that it is known from only one or a few locations which are potentially at risk.
