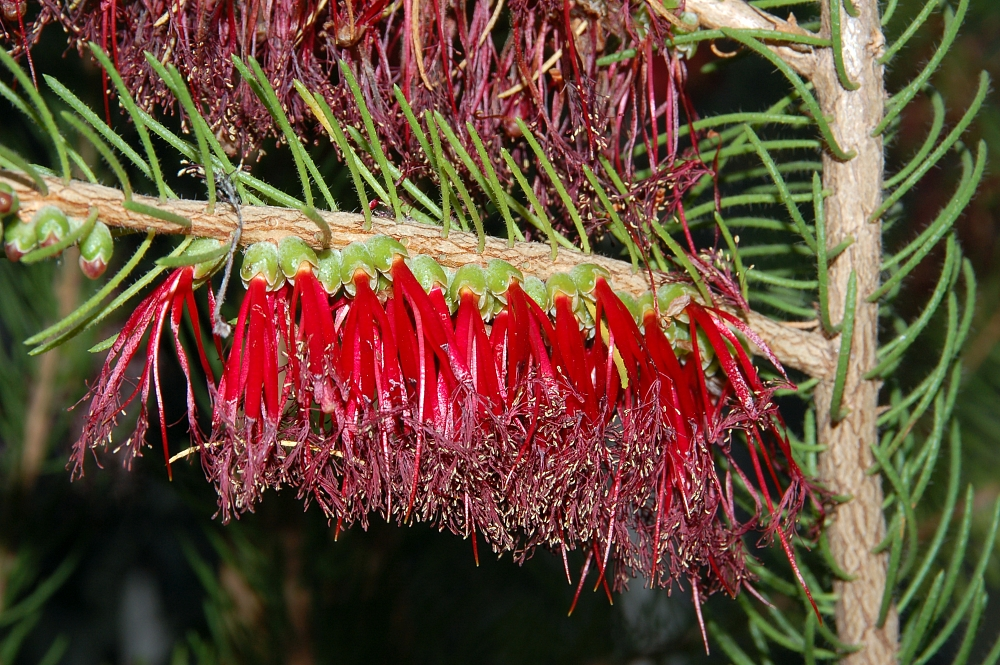
- Calothamnus quadrifidus

Scientific classification
- Kingdom: Plantae
- Clade: Tracheophytes
- Clade: Angiosperms
- Clade: Eudicots
- Clade: Rosids
- Order: Myrtales
- Family: Myrtaceae
- Tribe: Melaleuceae
- Genus: Calothamnus; Labill.

Synonyms
- Baudinia DC. nom. inval., pro syn.; Baudinia Rchb. nom. inval., pro syn.; Baudinia Heynh. nom. inval., pro syn.; Billotia Heynh. orth. var.; Billottia Colla; Calothamnus b. Billotia Rchb. orth. var.; Calothamnus b. Billottia (Colla) Rchb.; Calothamnus sect. Baudinia Kuntze nom. inval.; Calothamnus sect. Callithamnus Schauer nom. inval.; Calothamnus sect. Callithamnus Schauer nom. inval.; Calothamnus Labill. sect. Calothamnus

= Calothamnus =

Genus of flowering plants

Calothamnus is a genus of flowering plants in the family Myrtaceae and is endemic to the south-west of Western Australia. The common names one-sided bottlebrush or claw flower are given to some species due to their having the flowers clustered on one side of the stem or because of the claw-like appearance of their flowers. Calothamnus species are generally medium to tall woody shrubs with crowded leaves. In most species the leaves are crowded and linear in shape, and the flowers are usually arranged in dense clusters. The petals are small and fall off the flower soon after it opens but the stamens are long, numerous and usually bright red.

== Description ==
Plants in the genus Calothamnus are medium to tall shrubs, sometimes low-growing ground covers. The leaves are linear or narrow lance-shaped with the narrower end towards the base, usually glabrous and have distinct oil glands. The flowers are in small groups or dense spikes on leafless, older stems or between the leaves on younger ones. The sepals are fused to form a bell-shaped cup which is often immersed in the branch and there are four or five petals which usually fall off after the flower has opened. There are many stamens, joined for a large proportion of their length into four or five "claws". In some species the upper two claws are fused together and the lower ones are shorter. The stamens are brightly coloured, crimson to a deep purple or rarely yellow. The fruit is a woody capsule.

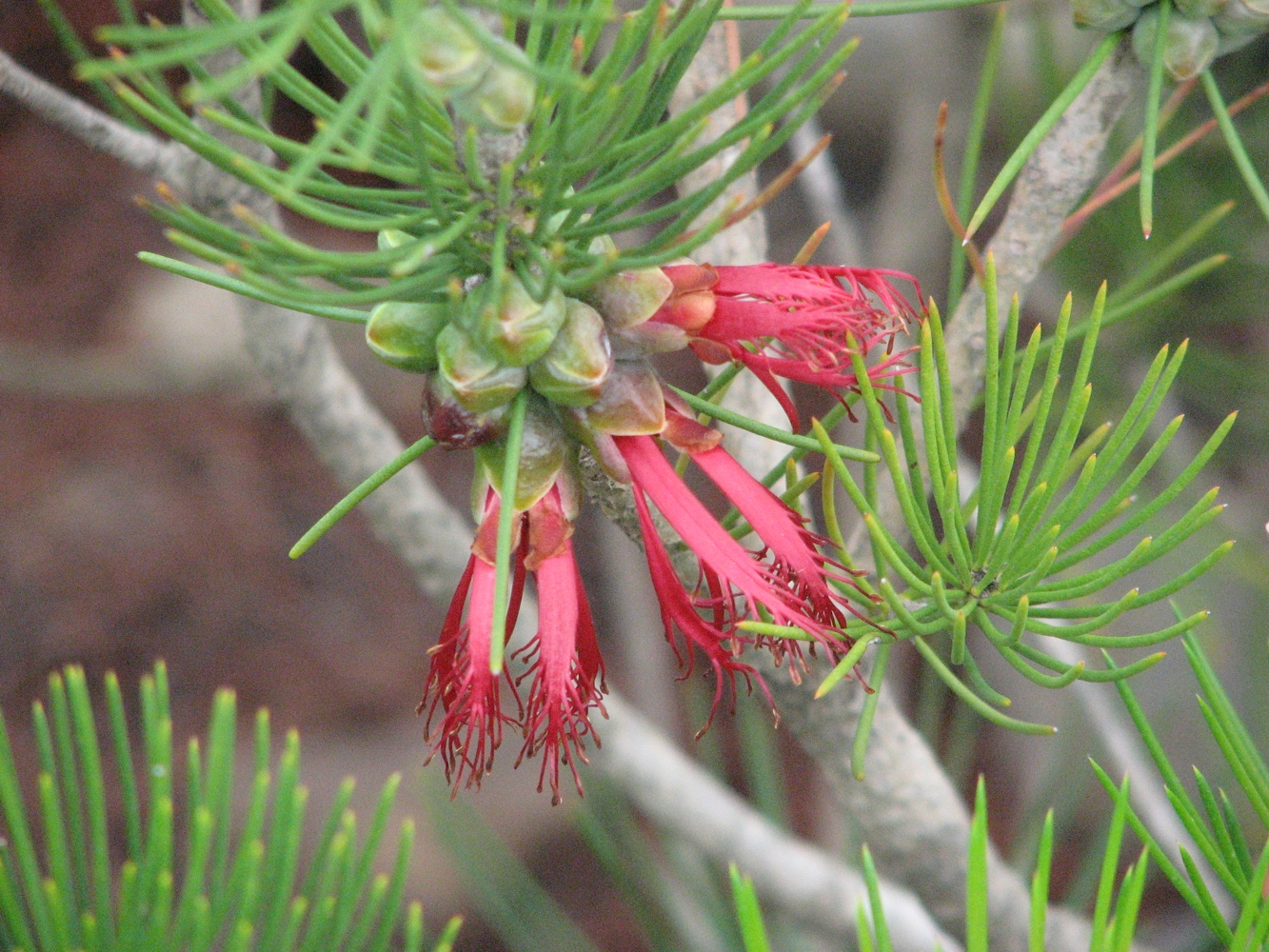
Calothamnus graniticus subsp. graniticus

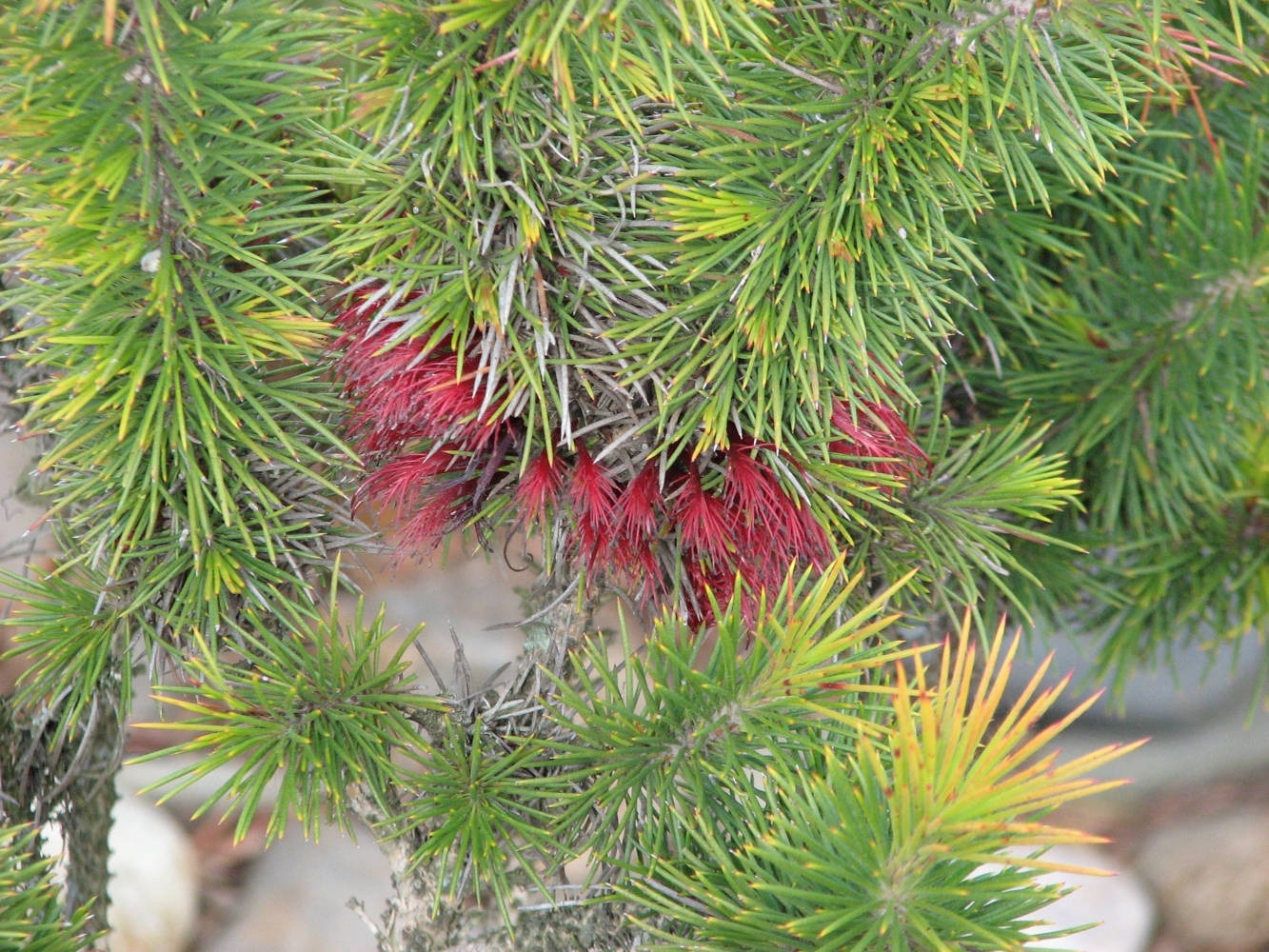
Calothamnus pinifolius

== Taxonomy and naming ==
The first species in the genus to be described was Calothamnus sanguineus. It was first formally described in 1806 by the French biologist Jacques Labillardière in Novae Hollandiae Plantarum Specimen, Volume 2. The name Calothamnus is derived from the Greek words kalos meaning "beautiful" and thamnos meaning "a shrub" or "a bush".

In 2014, Lyndley Craven and others proposed, mainly on the basis of DNA evidence, that species in the genus Calothamnus, along with those in Beaufortia, Conothamnus, Eremaea, Lamarchea, Petraeomyrtus, Phymatocarpus and Regelia be transferred to Melaleuca.

== Distribution and habitat ==
All Calothamnus species are found in the south west botanical province of Western Australia. Some (such as Calothamnus aridus) are adapted to a dry environment whilst others (such as Calothamnus hirsutus) are often found near swamps.

== Use in horticulture ==
Most species of Calothamnus have been grown in gardens but need full sun and good drainage. Propagation is usually from seeds which are retained in the hard fruits throughout the life of the plant but cuttings can be used to retain the colour of yellow forms.

== Species list ==
The following is a list of species accepted by the Australian Plant Census as at June 2025:

- Calothamnus accedens Hawkeswood
- Calothamnus affinis Turcz.
- Calothamnus arcuatus A.S.George
- Calothamnus aridus Hawkeswood
- Calothamnus blepharospermus F.Muell.
- Calothamnus borealis Hawkeswood
- Calothamnus brevifolius Hawkeswood
- Calothamnus chrysanthereus F.Muell. - claw flower
- Calothamnus cupularis A.S.George
- Calothamnus formosus Hawkeswood
- Calothamnus gibbosus Benth.
- Calothamnus gilesii F.Muell.
- Calothamnus glaber (Benth.) A.S.George
- Calothamnus gracilis R.Br.
- Calothamnus graniticus Hawkeswood
- Calothamnus hirsutus Hawkeswood
- Calothamnus huegelii Schauer
- Calothamnus lateralis Lindl.
- Calothamnus lehmannii Schauer
- Calothamnus longissimus F.Muell.
- Calothamnus macrocarpus Hawkeswood
- Calothamnus microcarpus F.Muell.
- Calothamnus montanus A.S.George
- Calothamnus oldfieldii F.Muell.
- Calothamnus pachystachyus Benth.
- Calothamnus phellosus A.S.George
- Calothamnus pinifolius F.Muell. - dense claw-flower
- Calothamnus planifolius Lehm.
- Calothamnus preissii Schauer
- Calothamnus quadrifidus R.Br. - one-sided bottlebrush
- Calothamnus robustus Schauer
- Calothamnus roseus A.S.George
- Calothamnus rupestris Schauer - mouse ears
- Calothamnus sanguineus Labill. - silky-leaved blood-flower
- Calothamnus scabridus A.S.George
- Calothamnus schaueri Lehm.
- Calothamnus superbus Hawkeswood & Mollemans
- Calothamnus torulosus Schauer
- Calothamnus tuberosus Hawkeswood
- Calothamnus validus S.Moore - Barrens claw-flower
- Calothamnus villosus R.Br.
