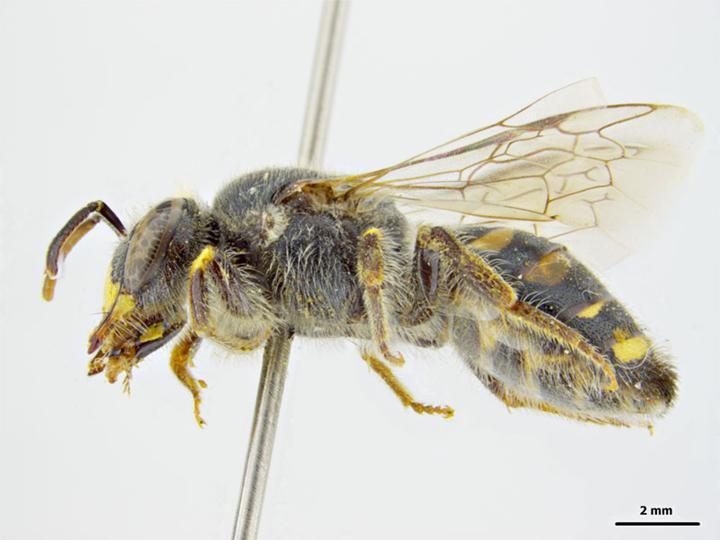
- Female

Scientific classification
- Kingdom: Animalia
- Phylum: Arthropoda
- Clade: Pancrustacea
- Class: Insecta
- Order: Hymenoptera
- Family: Colletidae
- Genus: Euhesma
- Species: E. wowine

Binomial name
- Euhesma wowine Exley, 2002

= Euhesma wowine =

Species of bee

Euhesma wowine, or Euhesma (Euhesma) wowine, is a species of bee in the family Colletidae and the subfamily Euryglossinae. It is endemic to Australia. It was described in 2002 by Australian entomologist Elizabeth Exley.

== Etymology ==
The specific epithet wowine is a Western Australian Aboriginal word for 'similar', referring to the similarity of females of this species to those of Euhesma crabronica.

== Description ==
The body length of the female is 10 mm, wing length 7 mm; male body length is 6 mm, wing length 4.5 mm. Colouration is mainly black and yellow.

== Distribution and habitat ==
The species occurs in Western Australia. The type locality is 3.5–5.5 km south of Yellowdine, in the Goldfields–Esperance region.

== Behaviour ==
The adults are flying mellivores. Flowering plants visited by the bees include Melaleuca scabra, Euryomyrtus ramosissima and Leptospermum species.

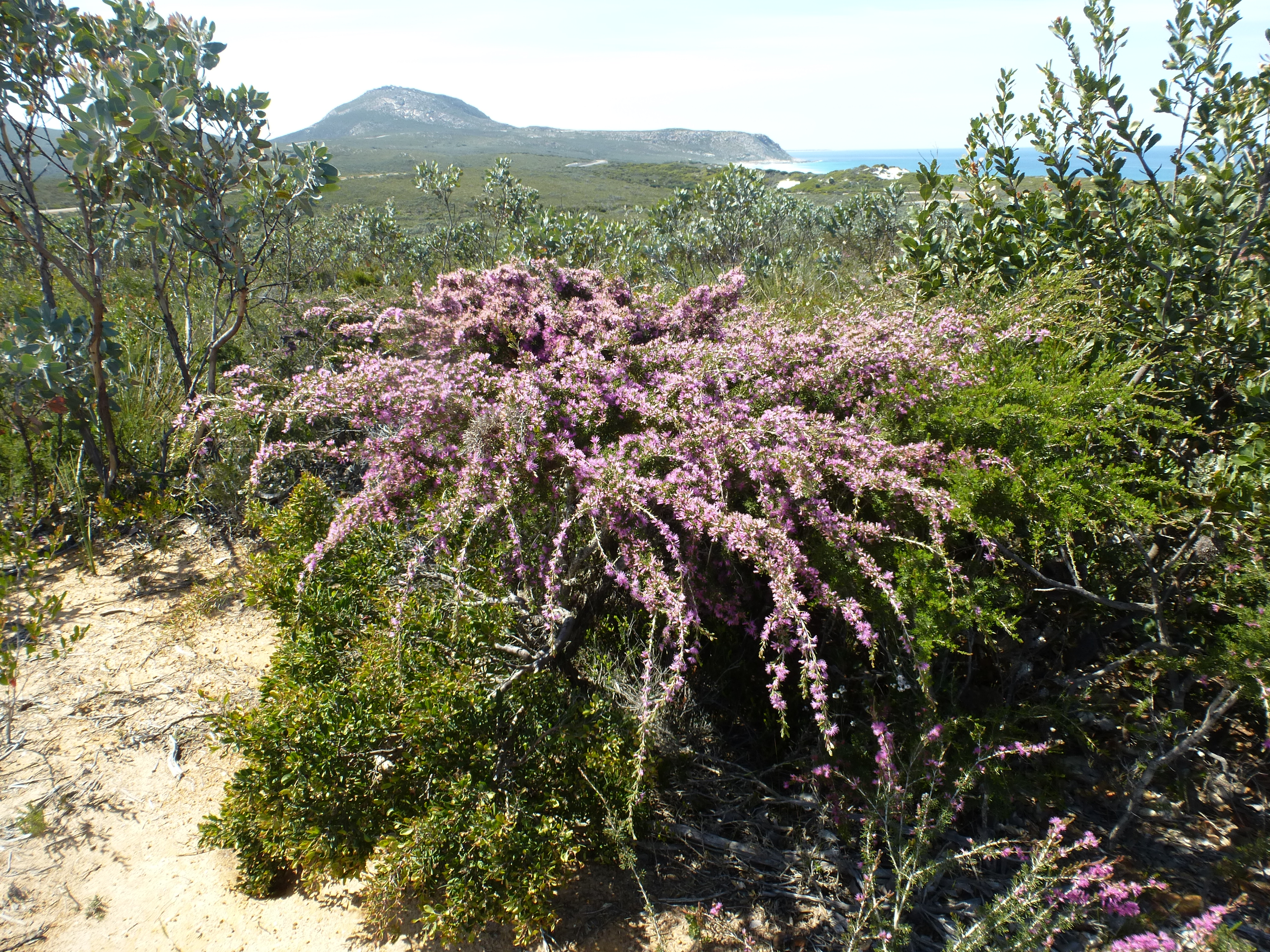
Melaleuca scabra, or rough honey-myrtle, a forage plant of the bees

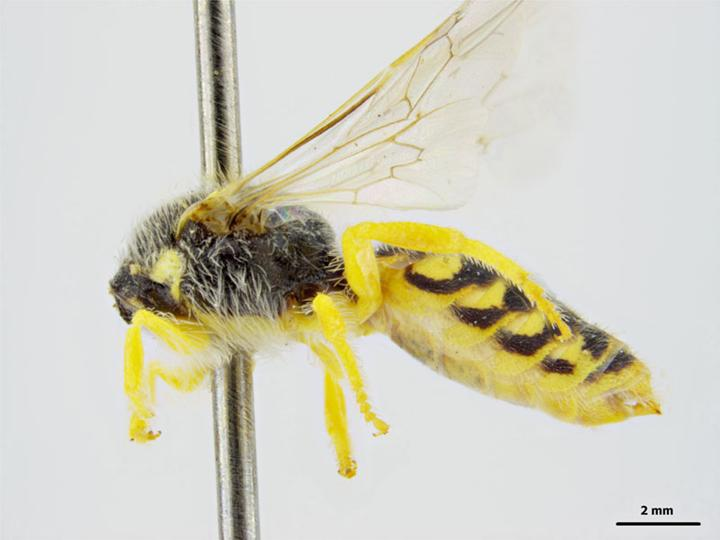
Male
