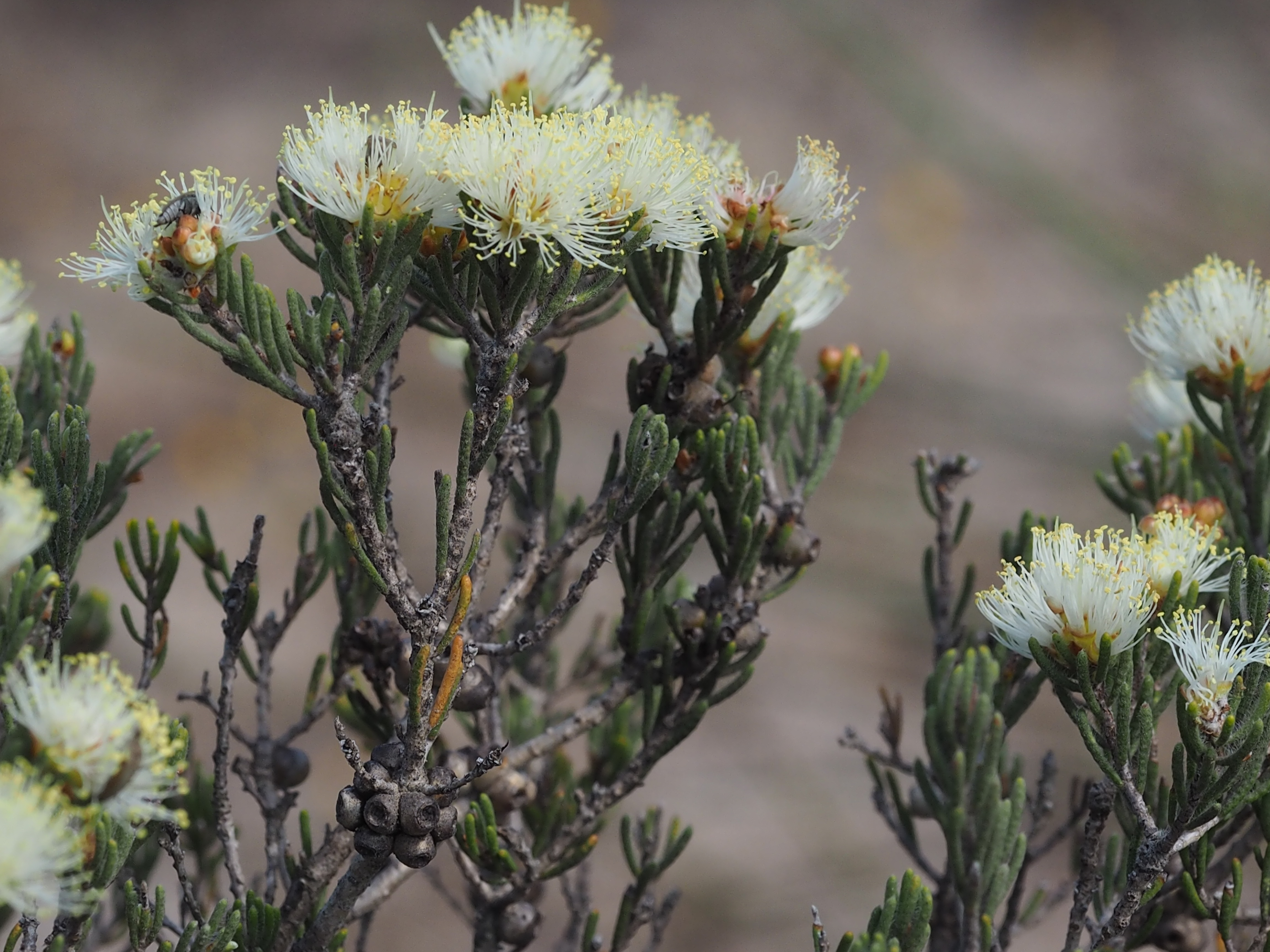

Scientific classification
- Kingdom: Plantae
- Clade: Tracheophytes
- Clade: Angiosperms
- Clade: Eudicots
- Clade: Rosids
- Order: Myrtales
- Family: Myrtaceae
- Genus: Melaleuca
- Species: M. dichroma

Binomial name
- Melaleuca dichroma Craven & Lepschi

Synonyms
- Melaleuca urceolatus var. virgata Benth.; Melaleuca virgata (Benth.) Craven

= Melaleuca dichroma =

Species of shrub

Melaleuca dichroma is a shrub in the myrtle family, Myrtaceae and is endemic to the south-west of Western Australia. It is unusual for its genus in that its flowers are yellow or creamy-white but age to a pinkish-red.

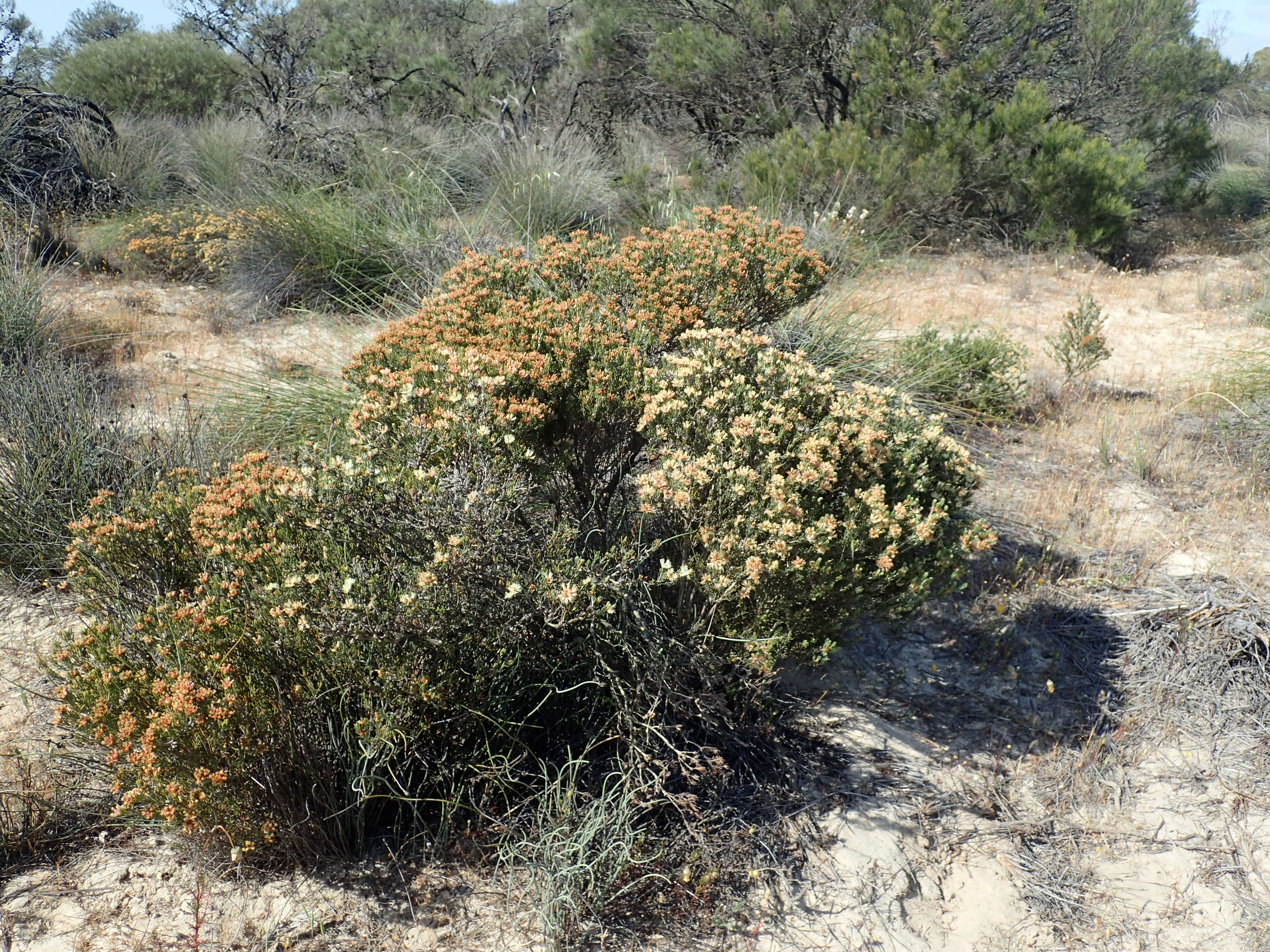
Habit in Gunyidi Nature Reserve

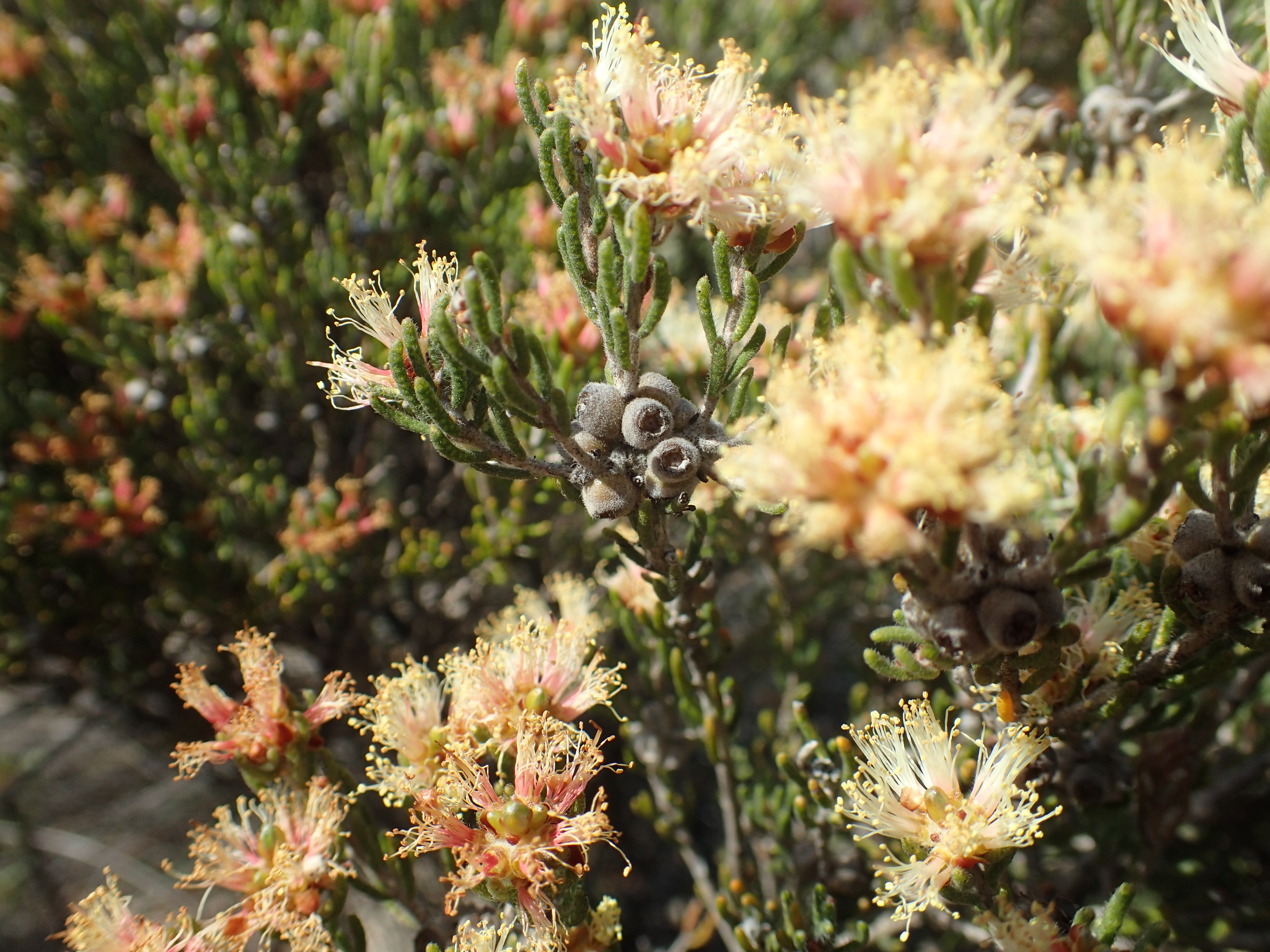
Fruit

== Description ==
Melaleuca dichroma is a shrub which can grow to a height of 1 m (3 ft). The leaves are arranged alternately, linear to narrow oval in shape, 3.7–15.5 mm (0.1–0.6 in) long, 0.5–1.3 mm (0.02–0.05 in) wide and lack a stalk.

The flowers are arranged in heads near the ends of branches which continue to grow after flowering, sometimes in the upper leaf axils. There are one to four groups of three flowers in each head, the heads up to 15 mm (0.6 in) in diameter. The flowers appear in spring and are initially pale yellow to creamy-white but fade to pinkish-red. The petals are 0.8–1.2 mm (0.03–0.05 in) long and fall off as the flowers age. The stamens are arranged in bundles of five around the flower, with 6 to 13 stamens in each bundle. Flowering occurs from August to November and is followed by fruit which are woody capsules 3–5 mm (0.1–0.2 in) long in clusters.

== Taxonomy and naming ==
Melaleuca urceolaris subsp. virgata was first formally described in 1867 by George Bentham in Flora Australiensis. In 1999 it was raised to species status as Melaleuca virgata by Lyndley Craven and Brendan Lepschi but the name was not valid. The name was changed in 2001 to Melaleuca dichroma by Craven and Lepschi in Australian Systematic Botany. The specific epithet (dichroma) is from the Greek di- meaning "two" or "double" and chroma, "colour", referring to the two colour phases of the flowers as they age.

This species is closely related to Melaleuca urceolaris, differing mainly in the arrangement of the flowers.

== Distribution and habitat ==
Melaleuca dichroma occurs in the Arrino, Hill River and Moora districts in the Avon Wheatbelt, Geraldton Sandplains and Swan Coastal Plain biogeographic regions. It grows in sandy, gravelly and loamy soils.

== Ecology ==
Melaleuca gnidioides is a distantly related species whose flowers also change colour as they age. It may signal to pollinators that a reward is no longer available.

== Conservation status ==
Melaleuca dichroma is listed as not threatened by the Government of Western Australia Department of Parks and Wildlife.

== Use in horticulture ==
This species is not well known in cultivation, but the similar Melaleuca urceolaris has been grown successfully for its showy flowers and interesting foliage, suggesting that Melaleuca dichroma may also have horticultural merit, especially for its two-tone flowers.
