= Benger Swamp =

Lake in Western Australia

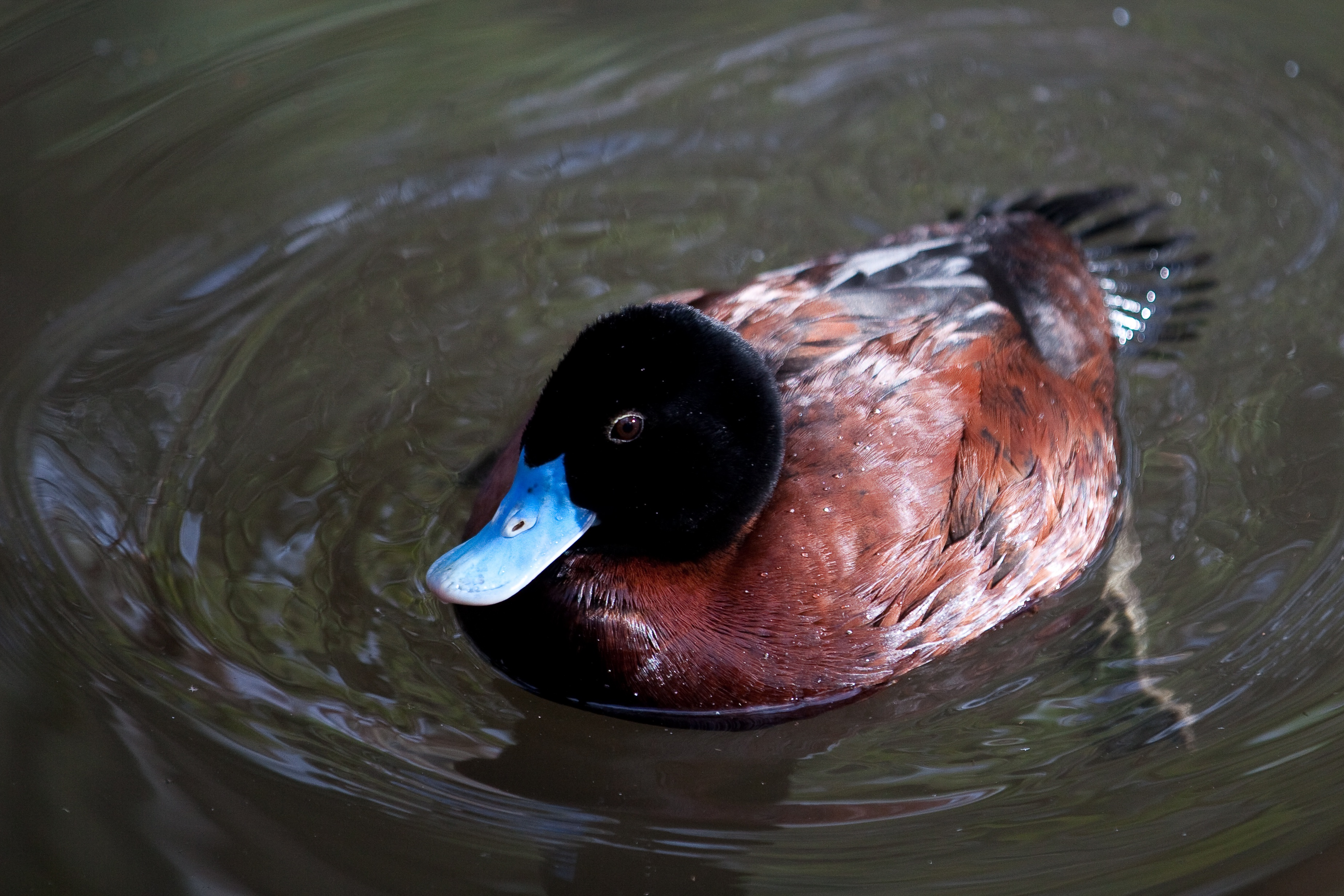
- The swamp supports globally important numbers of the blue-billed duck

- Location in Western Australia
- Interactive map of Benger Swamp
- Location: Swan Coastal Plain, Western Australia
- Coordinates: 33°10′15″S 115°50′10″E
- Type: Swamp
- Primary outflows: Groundwater; evaporation
- Basin countries: Australia
- Designation: Benger Swamp Nature Reserve
- Max. length: 2.8 km (1.7 mi)
- Max. width: 1.75 km (1.09 mi)
- Surface area: 580 hectares (1,433 acres)
- Max. depth: 0.8 m (2 ft 7 in)
- Surface elevation: 15 m (49 ft)

Benger Swamp is a wetland located on the Swan Coastal Plain, in south-west Western Australia.

The wetland is situated 2 kilometres (1.2 mi) west of Benger, 14 kilometres (8.7 mi) east of the coastal town of Binningup, 12 kilometres (7.5 mi) south-west of Harvey, and 155 kilometres (96 mi) south of Perth. Some 89% of the swamp is protected within the Benger Swamp Nature Reserve, while the remaining 11%, mainly in the northern part, is privately owned. It is a seasonally important site for waterbirds and is classified by BirdLife International as an Important Bird Area, with special regard to the conservation of freckled ducks and Australasian bitterns. Water levels in the swamp are controlled artificially and are managed both for waterbird conservation and for farming.

== Description ==
The swamp lies in a depression on the Pinjarra Plain, part of the Swan Coastal Plain. The soils are friable, dark grey loams overlying clays. To the west of the swamp are low ridges formed by wind erosion of the swamp surface when dried out in summer. Salinity measurements indicate that the swamp is a lens of fresh water overlying a saline water table.

=== Flora ===
Some 20% of the swamp is covered by Melaleuca trees and scrub, mainly on the northern and eastern edges. Of the four species there, Melaleuca rhaphiophylla (swamp paperbark) occurs as a dense low forest up to 10 metres (33 ft) in height, while Melaleuca viminea, M. laterita and M. scabra are shrubs. Half the swamp is covered by stands of the introduced bulrush Typha orientalis. Baumea articulata (jointed rush) sedgeland covers about 1% of the swamp area. Flooded areas are dominated by couch grass (Cynodon dactylon) and water couch (Paspalum distichum).

=== Fauna ===
As well as freckled ducks and Australasian bitterns, other wetland bird species for which the swamp is an important site include the Pacific and white-faced herons, white and straw-necked ibis, swamp harrier, purple swamphen, hardhead, spotless crake, wood sandpiper, Australian reed-warbler, little grassbird and blue-billed duck.

Native mammals include western grey kangaroos and rakali. Tiger snakes are common, as are introduced animals such as foxes, cats and rodents.

== Threats ==
The stands of Typha dry out during the hot-dry summers of the region, providing fuel for bushfires which destroy the Melaleucas that provide moulting and breeding habitat for freckled ducks.
