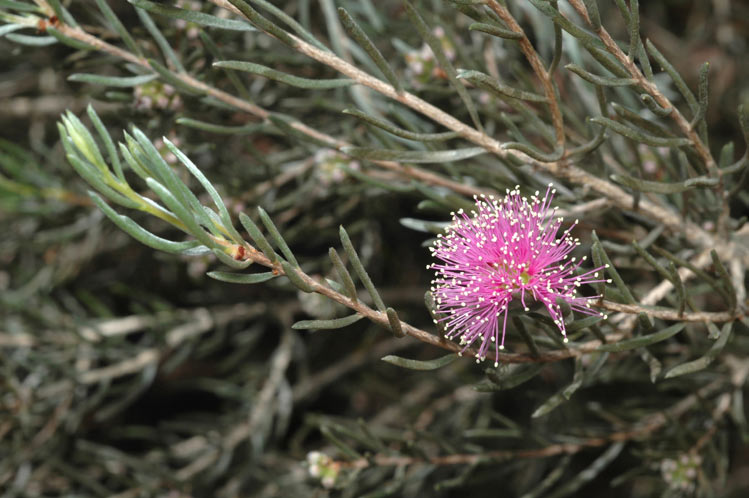

Scientific classification
- Kingdom: Plantae
- Clade: Embryophytes
- Clade: Tracheophytes
- Clade: Spermatophytes
- Clade: Angiosperms
- Clade: Eudicots
- Clade: Rosids
- Order: Myrtales
- Family: Myrtaceae
- Genus: Melaleuca
- Species: M. sapientes

Binomial name
- Melaleuca sapientes Craven

= Melaleuca sapientes =

Species of shrub

Melaleuca sapientes is a plant in the myrtle family, Myrtaceae, endemic to the south-west of Western Australia. It is a small shrub with silky grey leaves and small heads of pinkish flowers in spring or early summer. The attractive, silvery foliage has made this melaleuca a popular garden plant under the incorrect name of Melaleuca holosericea, a similar but much rarer species.

== Description ==
Melaleuca sapientes is a dense, spreading shrub growing to 1–3 m (3–10 ft) tall with whitish-grey, papery bark and silvery foliage. Its leaves are arranged alternately, mostly 6–19.5 mm (0.2–0.8 in) long, 0.8–2.1 mm (0.03–0.08 in) wide, linear to very narrow egg-shaped, usually half moon-shaped in cross section and covered with soft, silky hairs.

The flowers are a shade of pink or purple, arranged in heads on the ends of branches which continue to grow after flowering and sometimes also in the upper leaf axils. The heads are up to 20 mm (0.8 in) in diameter and contain two to six groups of flowers in threes. The outer surface of the flower cup (the hypanthium) is silky-hairy. The petals are 1.2–2 mm (0.05–0.08 in) long and fall off as the flower matures. Five bundles of stamens are seen around the flower, each with seven to nine stamens. Flowering occurs between August and January and is followed by fruit which are woody capsules, 3–4.5 mm (0.1–0.2 in) long and usually in small clusters along the stem.

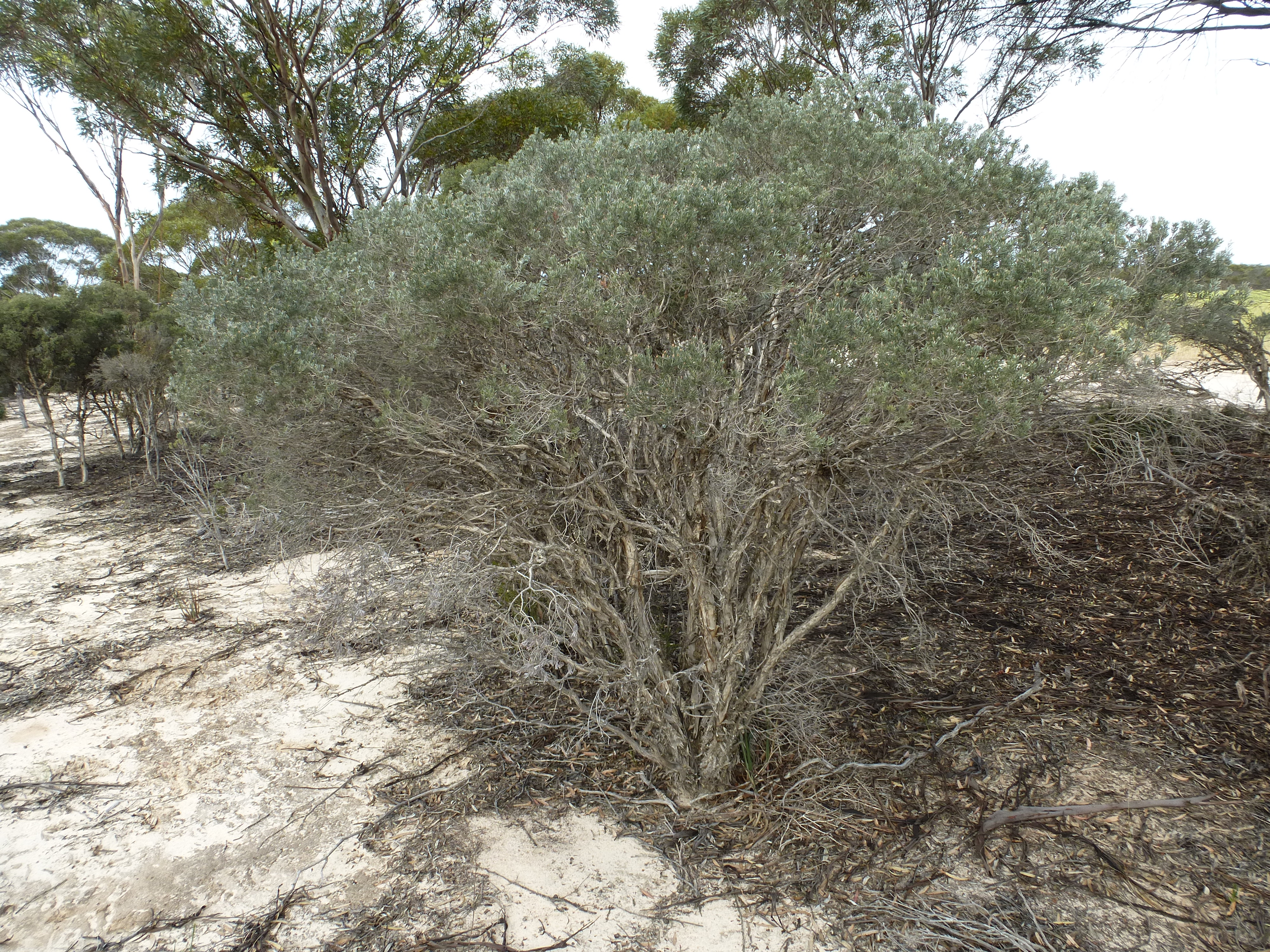
Habit in the Holt Nature Reserve near Salmon Gums

== Taxonomy and naming ==
Melaleuca sapientes was first formally described in 1999 by Lyndley Craven in Australian Systematic Botany from a specimen collected 12 km (7 mi) north of Salmon Gums. The specific epithet (sapientes) honours Rob and Ann Smart, farmers near Jerramungup, for their assistance with research into the Melaleuca genus. Sapientes is derived from the Latin word sapiens meaning "wise", hence "Smart".

== Distribution and habitat ==
This melaleuca occurs in and between the Jerramungup, Hyden, Salmon Gums, and Ponier Rock districts in the Coolgardie, Esperance Plains and Mallee biogeographic regions. It grows in gravel, sandy clay, or loam on slopes.

== Conservation ==
Melaleuca sapientes is listed as not threatened by the Government of Western Australia Department of Parks and Wildlife.

== Use in horticulture ==
This species of melaleuca has been cultivated as Melaleuca holosericea, mainly because of its attractive, silvery foliage. It grows well in a range of soils.

== Gallery ==
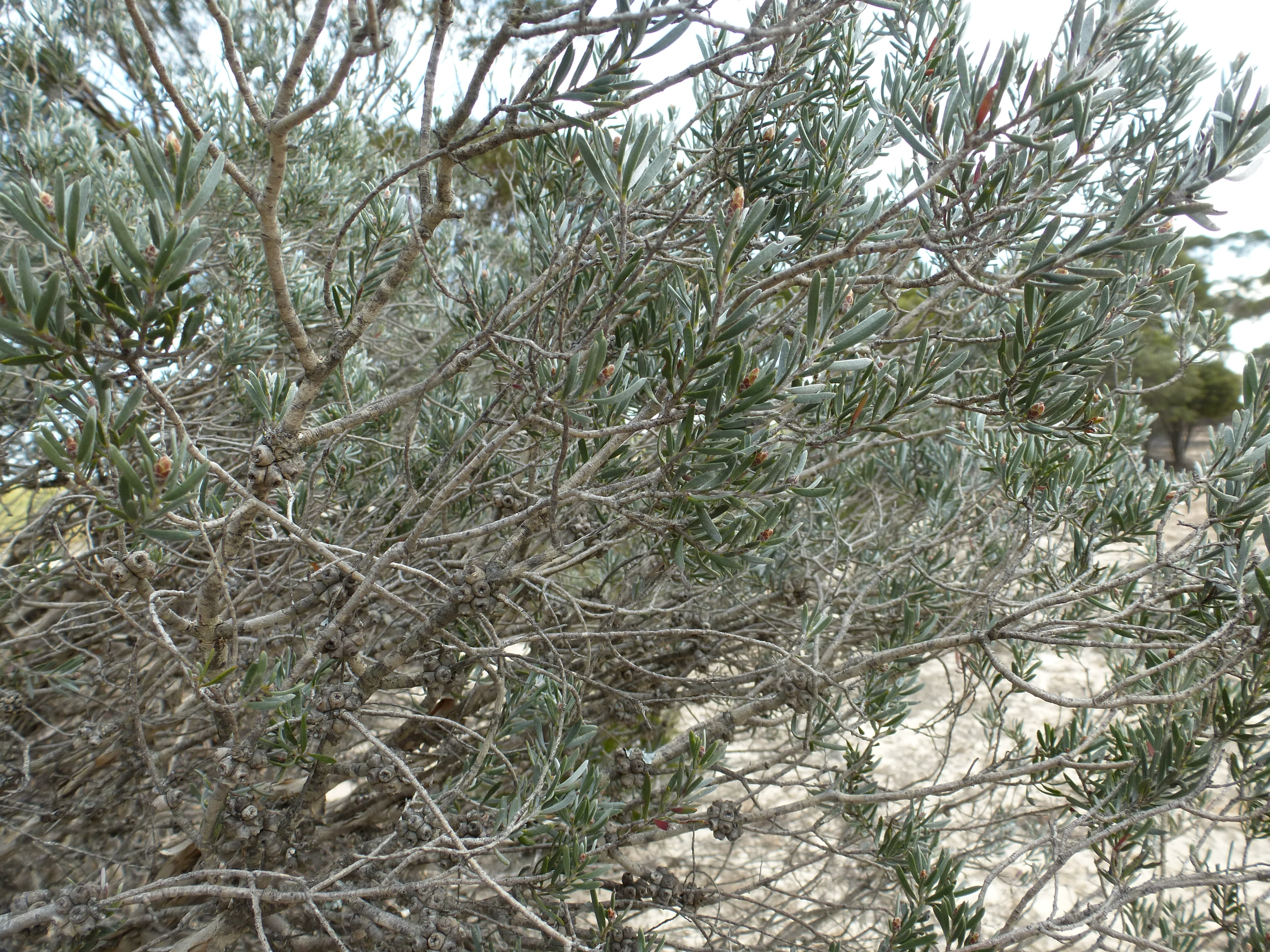
Leaves and fruit

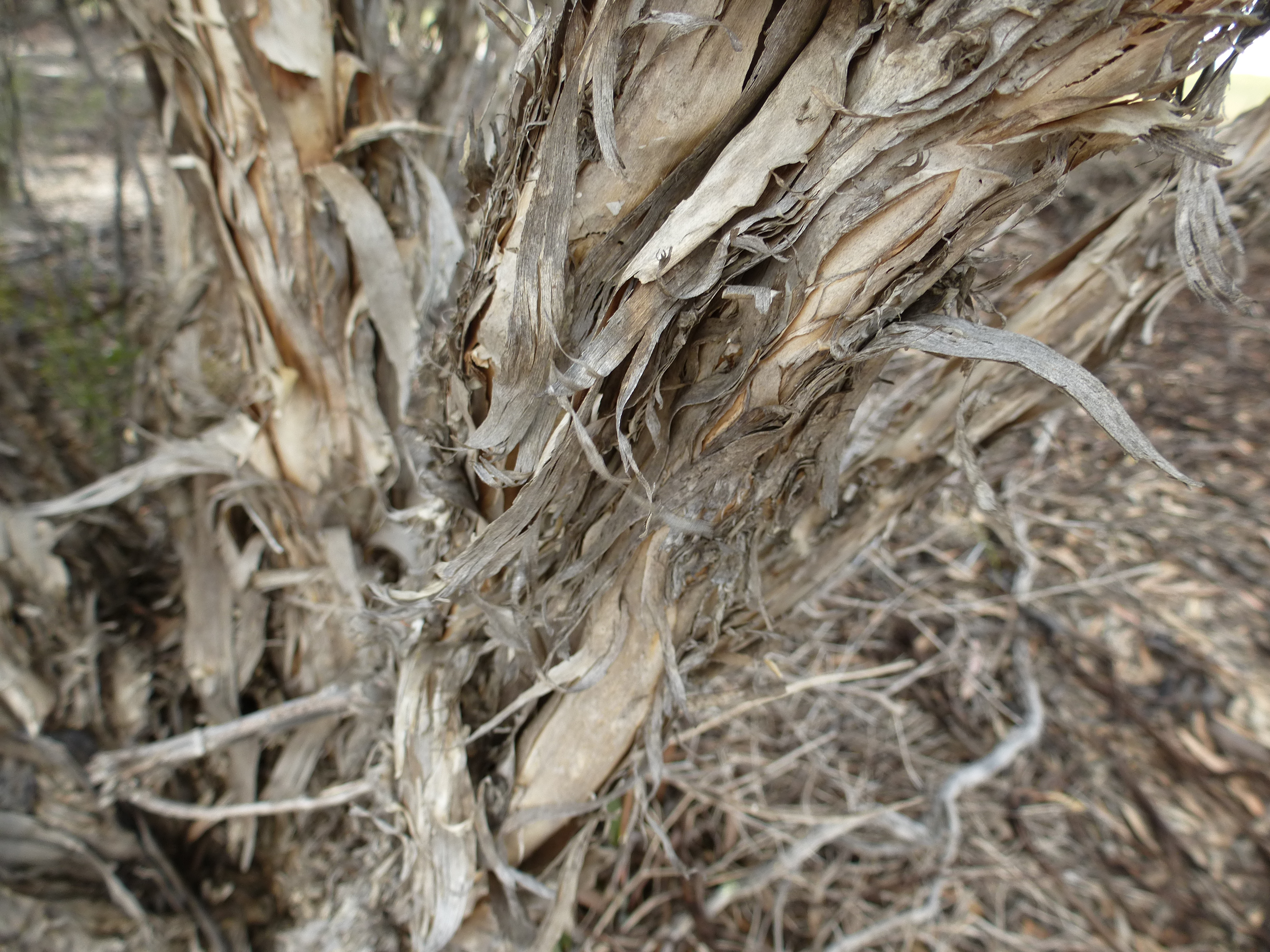
Bark
