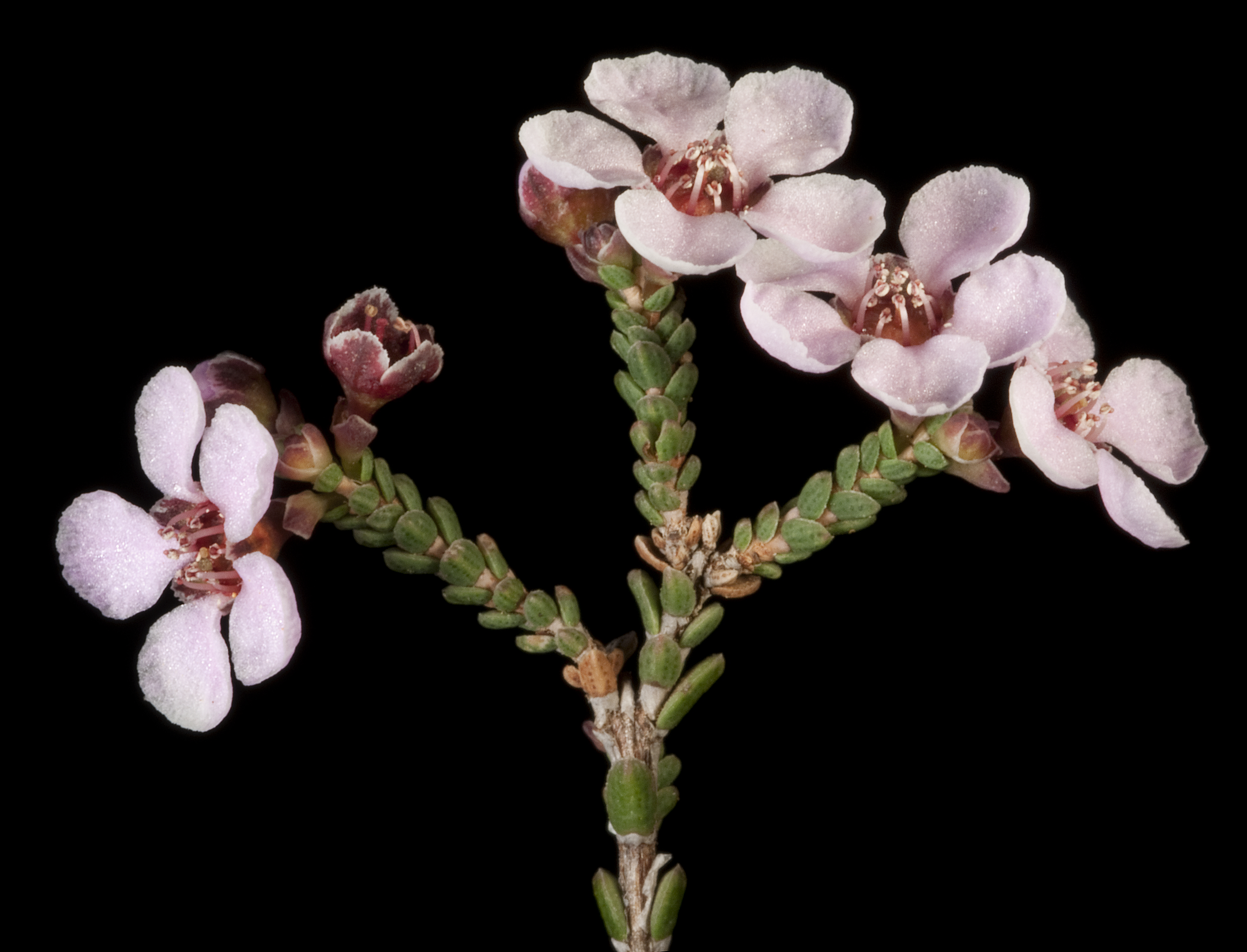

Scientific classification
- Kingdom: Plantae
- Clade: Tracheophytes
- Clade: Angiosperms
- Clade: Eudicots
- Clade: Rosids
- Order: Myrtales
- Family: Myrtaceae
- Genus: Euryomyrtus
- Species: E. maidenii

Binomial name
- Euryomyrtus maidenii (Ewart & Jean White) Trudgen

= Euryomyrtus maidenii =

Species of flowering plant

Euryomyrtus maidenii is a shrub endemic to Western Australia.

The erect, compact or spreading shrub typically grows to a height of 0.1 to 0.9 metres (0.3 to 3.0 ft). It blooms between March and October producing purple-pink flowers.

It is found on sand plains in the Wheatbelt, Mid West and Goldfields-Esperance regions of Western Australia where it grows in sandy soils over laterite.
