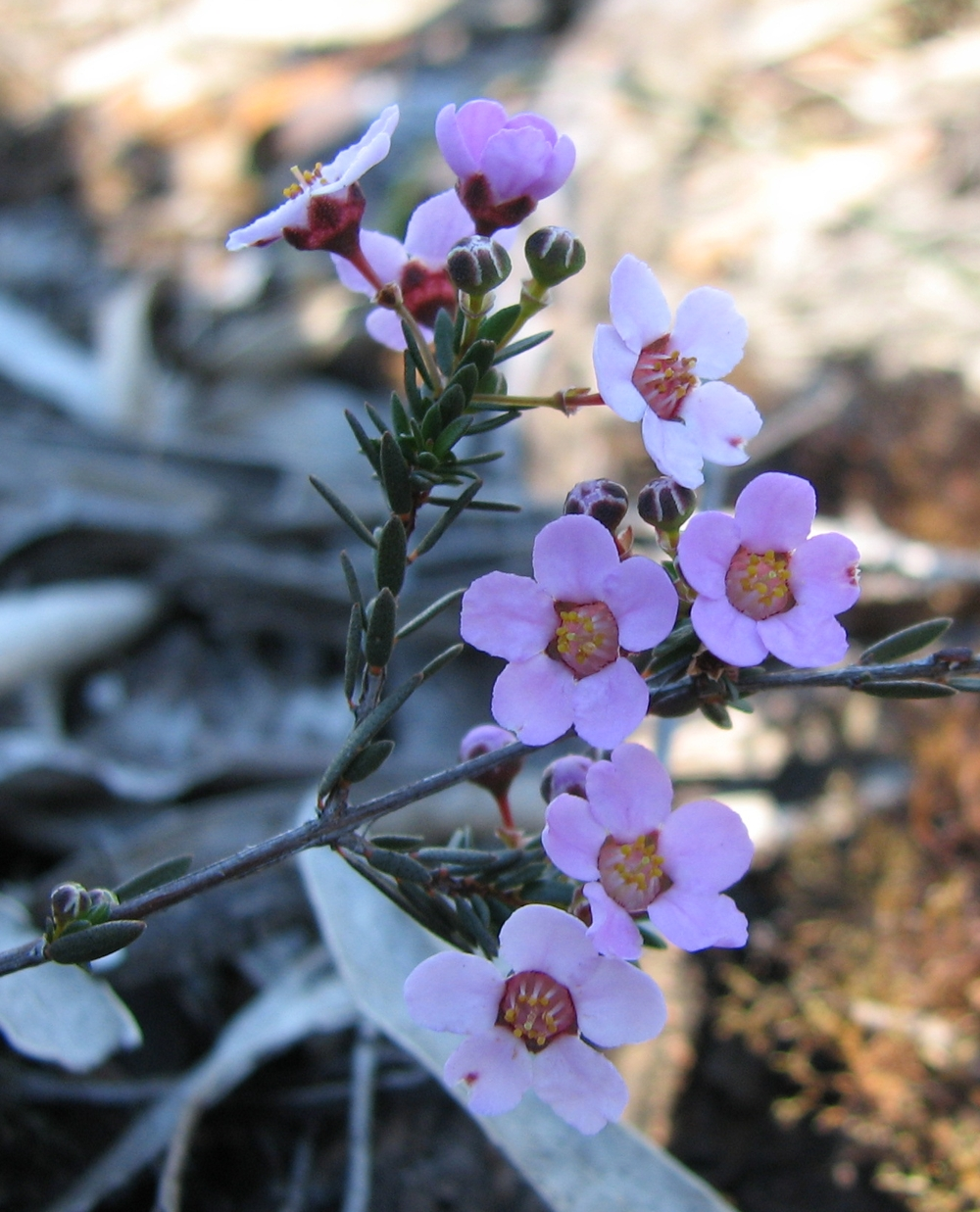
- Euryomyrtus ramosissima in Greater Bendigo National Park.

Scientific classification
- Kingdom: Plantae
- Clade: Tracheophytes
- Clade: Angiosperms
- Clade: Eudicots
- Clade: Rosids
- Order: Myrtales
- Family: Myrtaceae
- Subfamily: Myrtoideae
- Tribe: Chamelaucieae
- Genus: Euryomyrtus; Schauer

Species
- See text

= Euryomyrtus =

Genus of flowering plants

Euryomyrtus is a genus of shrubs, in the family Myrtaceae, all of which are endemic to Australia.

Species include:

- Euryomyrtus denticulata (Maiden & Betche) Trudgen
- Euryomyrtus inflata Trudgen
- Euryomyrtus leptospermoides (C.A.Gardner) Trudgen
- Euryomyrtus maidenii (Ewart & Jean White) Trudgen
- Euryomyrtus patrickiae Trudgen
- Euryomyrtus ramosissima (A.Cunn.) Trudgen - Rosy baeckea
- Euryomyrtus recurva Trudgen

== Distribution ==
Species within this genus are found in Western Australia, South Australia, New South Wales, Australian Capital Territory, Victoria and Tasmania.
