= Euryomyrtus patrickiae =

Scientific classification
- Kingdom: Plantae
- Clade: Tracheophytes
- Clade: Angiosperms
- Clade: Eudicots
- Clade: Rosids
- Order: Myrtales
- Family: Myrtaceae
- Genus: Euryomyrtus
- Species: E. patrickiae

Binomial name
- Euryomyrtus patrickiae Trudgen

Species of flowering plant

Euryomyrtus patrickiae is a shrub endemic to Western Australia.

The low rounded shrub typically grows to a height of 0.3 metres (1.0 ft). It is found on rises in the Mid West and Goldfields-Esperance regions of Western Australia where it grows in stony loam and sandy soils.
