= Euryomyrtus inflata =

Conservation status
- Priority Three — Poorly Known Taxa (DEC)

Scientific classification
- Kingdom: Plantae
- Clade: Tracheophytes
- Clade: Angiosperms
- Clade: Eudicots
- Clade: Rosids
- Order: Myrtales
- Family: Myrtaceae
- Genus: Euryomyrtus
- Species: E. inflata

Binomial name
- Euryomyrtus inflata Trudgen

Species of flowering plant

Euryomyrtus inflata is a shrub endemic to Western Australia.

The shrub typically grows to a height of 0.3 to 0.7 metres (1.0 to 2.3 ft) and has dull green leaves. It blooms between June and July producing white-pink flowers followed by erect fruits.

It is found on flat plains in the Mid West region of Western Australia between Sandstone, Meekatharra and Wiluna where it grows in deep red sandy soils.
