= Euryomyrtus recurva =

Conservation status
- Priority Three — Poorly Known Taxa (DEC)

Scientific classification
- Kingdom: Plantae
- Clade: Tracheophytes
- Clade: Angiosperms
- Clade: Eudicots
- Clade: Rosids
- Order: Myrtales
- Family: Myrtaceae
- Genus: Euryomyrtus
- Species: E. recurva

Binomial name
- Euryomyrtus recurva Trudgen

Species of flowering plant

Euryomyrtus recurva is a shrub endemic to Western Australia.

The shrub typically grows to a height of 0.3 to 1 metre (1.0 to 3.3 ft). It blooms between July and September producing white-pink flowers.

It is found on catchment slopes and in gravel pits in the Wheatbelt, Mid West and Goldfields-Esperance regions of Western Australia where it grows in sandy-clay soils.
