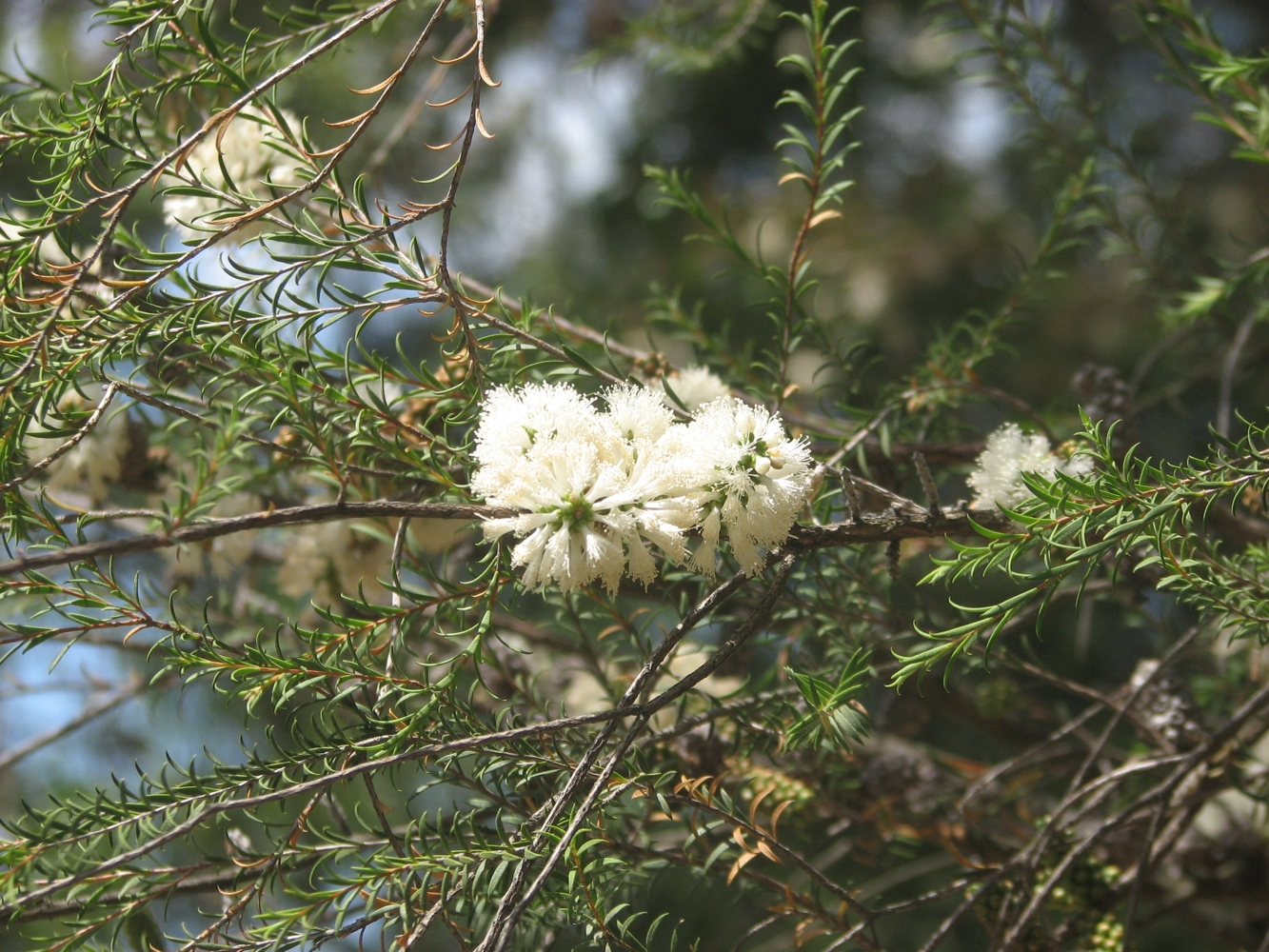
- Melaleuca viminea in Maranoa Gardens

Conservation status
- Least Concern (IUCN 3.1)

Scientific classification
- Kingdom: Plantae
- Clade: Embryophytes
- Clade: Tracheophytes
- Clade: Spermatophytes
- Clade: Angiosperms
- Clade: Eudicots
- Clade: Rosids
- Order: Myrtales
- Family: Myrtaceae
- Genus: Melaleuca
- Species: M. viminea

Binomial name
- Melaleuca viminea Lindl.

Synonyms
- Myrtoleucodendron vimineum (Lindl.) Kuntze

= Melaleuca viminea =

Mohan

Species of flowering plant

Melaleuca viminea, commonly known as mohan, is a plant in the myrtle family Myrtaceae and is endemic to the south-west of Western Australia. It is variable in size and form, from a densely branched small shrub to a small tree. Its leaves are linear to narrowly oval, the flowers white to cream-coloured, in heads of 5 to 50, and the fruit is a woody capsule.

== Description ==
Melaleuca viminea grows to 0.5–15 m (2–50 ft) in height and has fibrous or papery bark. Its leaves are arranged in opposite pairs, each leaf 3–20 mm (0.1–0.8 in) long and 0.6–2 millimetres (0.02–0.08 in) wide, linear to narrow oval in shape, tapering to a point.

Its flowers are in heads, at or near the ends of the branches in groups, 25 mm (1 in) in diameter composed of 5 to 50 individual white or cream flowers. The stamens are arranged in five bundles around the flower, each bundle having 3 to 16 stamens. Flowers appear from July to November and are described as smelling sickly. The fruit are woody capsules, 2–4 mm (0.08–0.2 in) long.

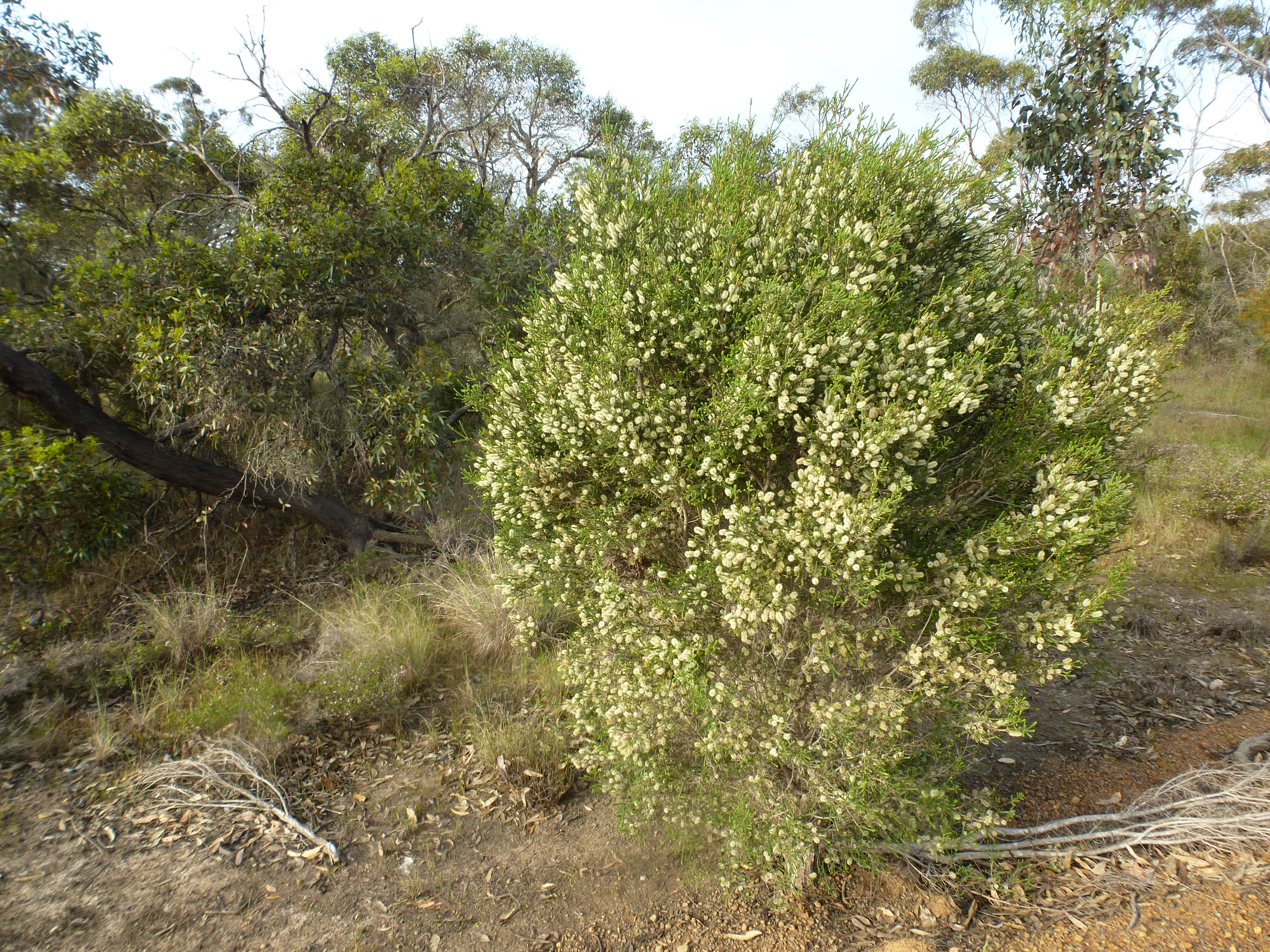
Habit near Mount Barker

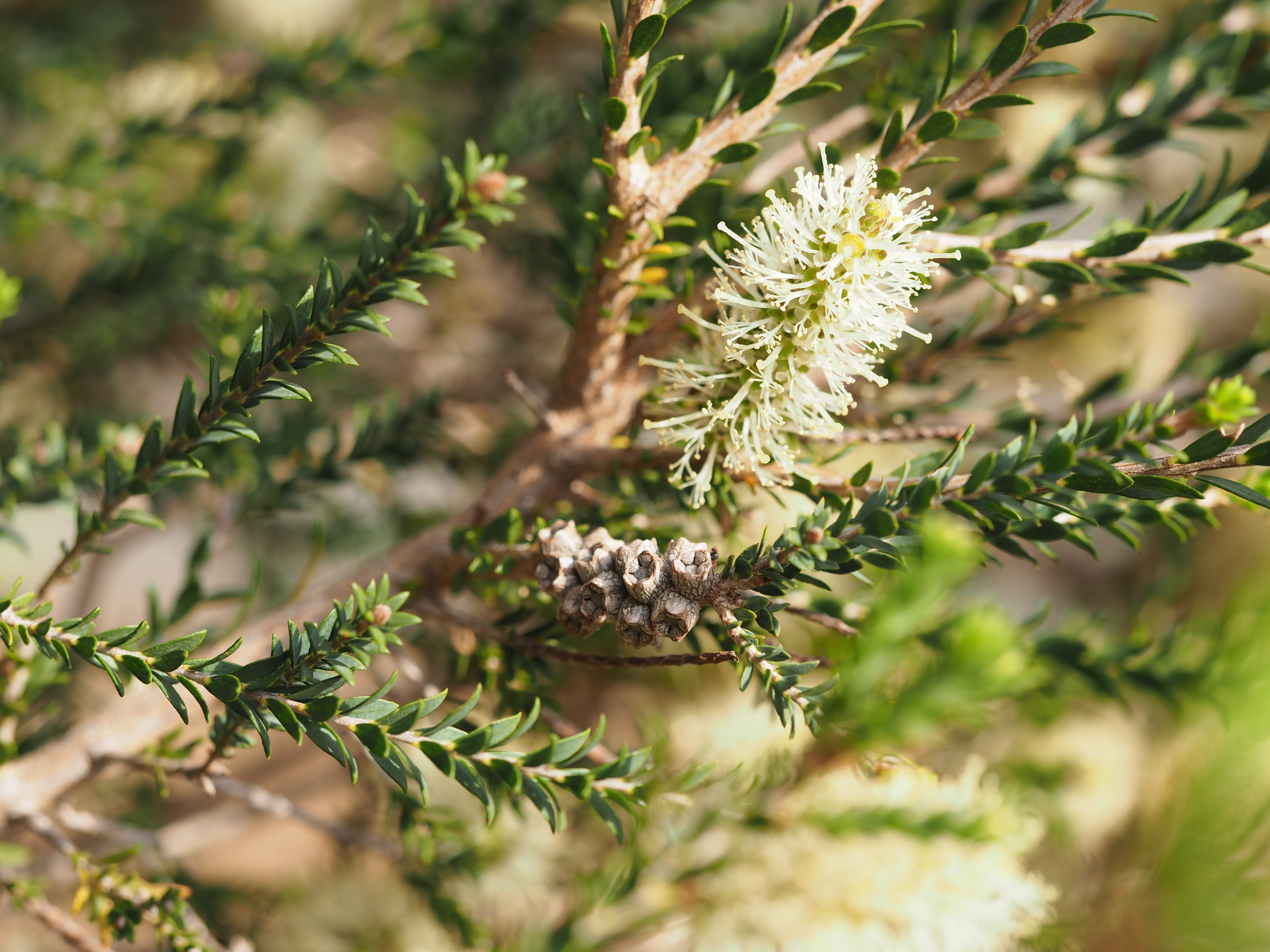
Fruit

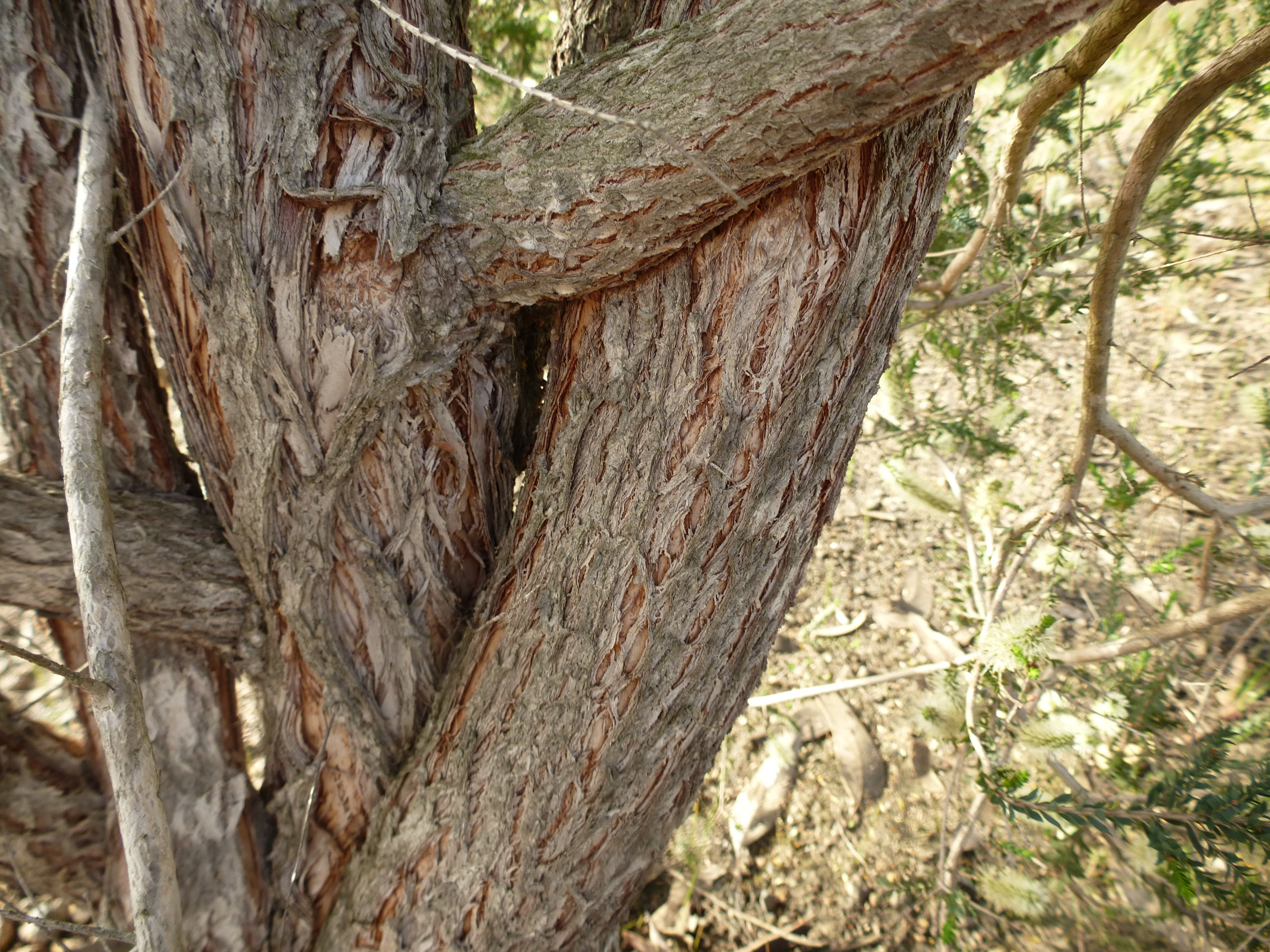
Bark

== Taxonomy and naming ==
This species was first formally described in 1839 by John Lindley in A Sketch of the Vegetation of the Swan River Colony. The specific epithet (viminea) is a Latin word meaning "pliant" or "willowy".

The names of three subspecies of Melaleuca vimminalis are currently recognised by the Australian Plant Census:

- Melaleuca viminea subsp. appressa Barlow is distinguished by its small leaves, pressed against the branchlets - it occurs in three disjunct populations - Ongerup, Mt Burdett and Yilgarn districts.
- Melaleuca viminea subsp. demissa Quinn ex. Craven mainly occurs in the Walpole-Manypeaks district.
- Melaleuca viminea Lindl. subsp. viminea occurs in the Kalbarri district south to the Busselton and Albany districts, and eastwards to the Muntadgin and Fitzgerald River districts; it is naturalised locally in southern Victoria.

== Distribution and habitat ==
This melaleuca is widespread in the south-west of Western Australia. It grows in sandy or clayey soils near watercourses, winter-wet depressions, rocky coastal areas and flats.

== Conservation ==
Melaleuca viminea, subsp. demissa and viminea are listed as not threatened but subsp. appressa is listed as priority two by the Government of Western Australia Department of Biodiversity, Conservation and Attractions meaning it may be threatened but is poorly known, only occurring in a few locations.
