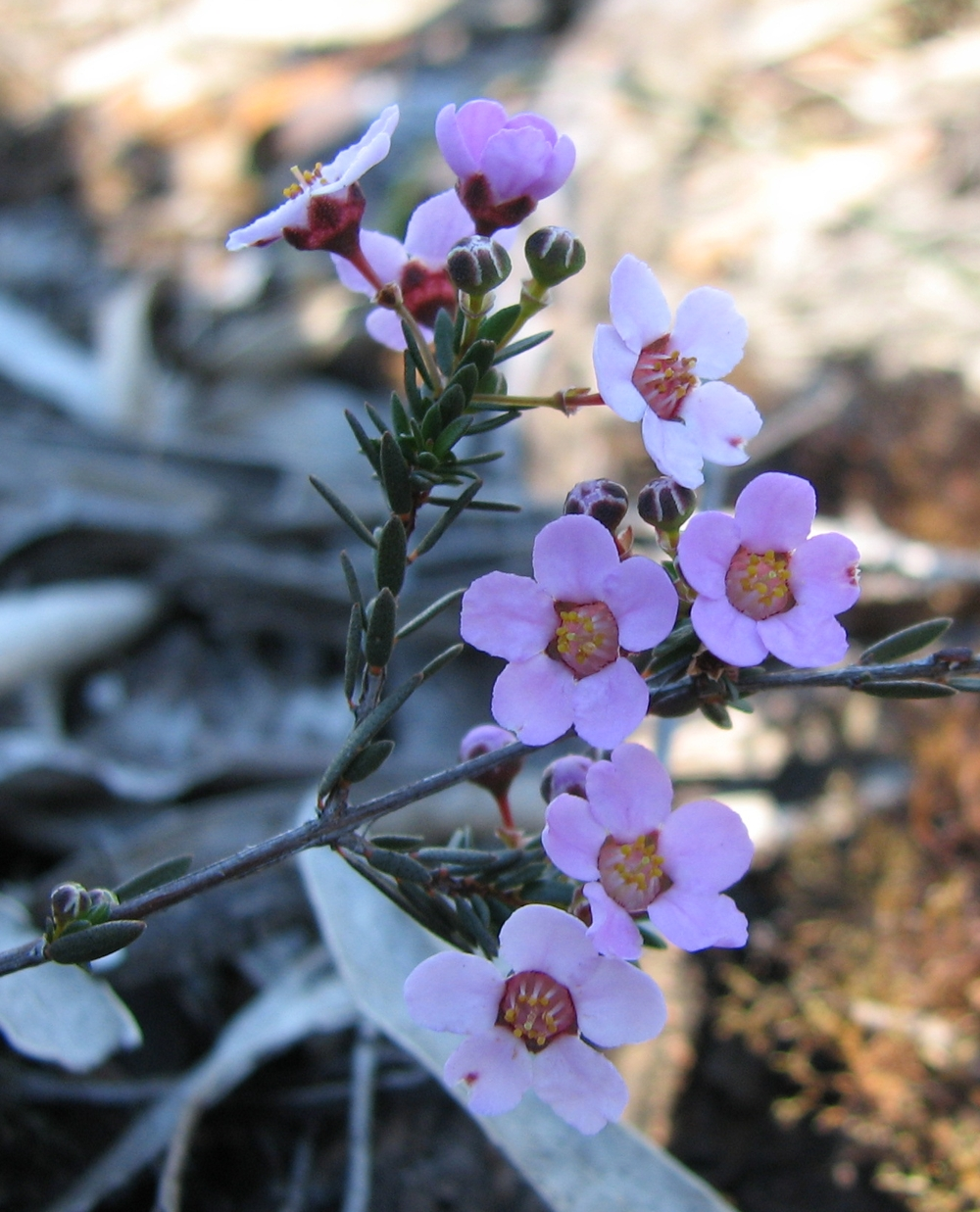
- Euryomyrtus ramosissima in Greater Bendigo National Park.

Scientific classification
- Kingdom: Plantae
- Clade: Tracheophytes
- Clade: Angiosperms
- Clade: Eudicots
- Clade: Rosids
- Order: Myrtales
- Family: Myrtaceae
- Genus: Euryomyrtus
- Species: E. ramosissima

Binomial name
- Euryomyrtus ramosissima (A.Cunn.) Trudgen

Synonyms
- Baeckea ramosissima A.Cunn.; Euryomyrtus alpina (Lindl.) Schauer; Baeckea diffusa Sieber ex DC.; Baeckea diffusa var. striata DC.; Baeckea thymifolia Hook.f.; Euryomyrtus thymifolia (Hook.f.) Schauer; Baeckea affinis Hook.f.; Baeckea alpina Lindl.; Euryomyrtus stuartiana Miq.; Euryomyrtus leptospermoides F.Muell. ex Miq.; Euryomyrtus diffusa (Sieber ex DC.) Schauer

= Euryomyrtus ramosissima =

Species of plant

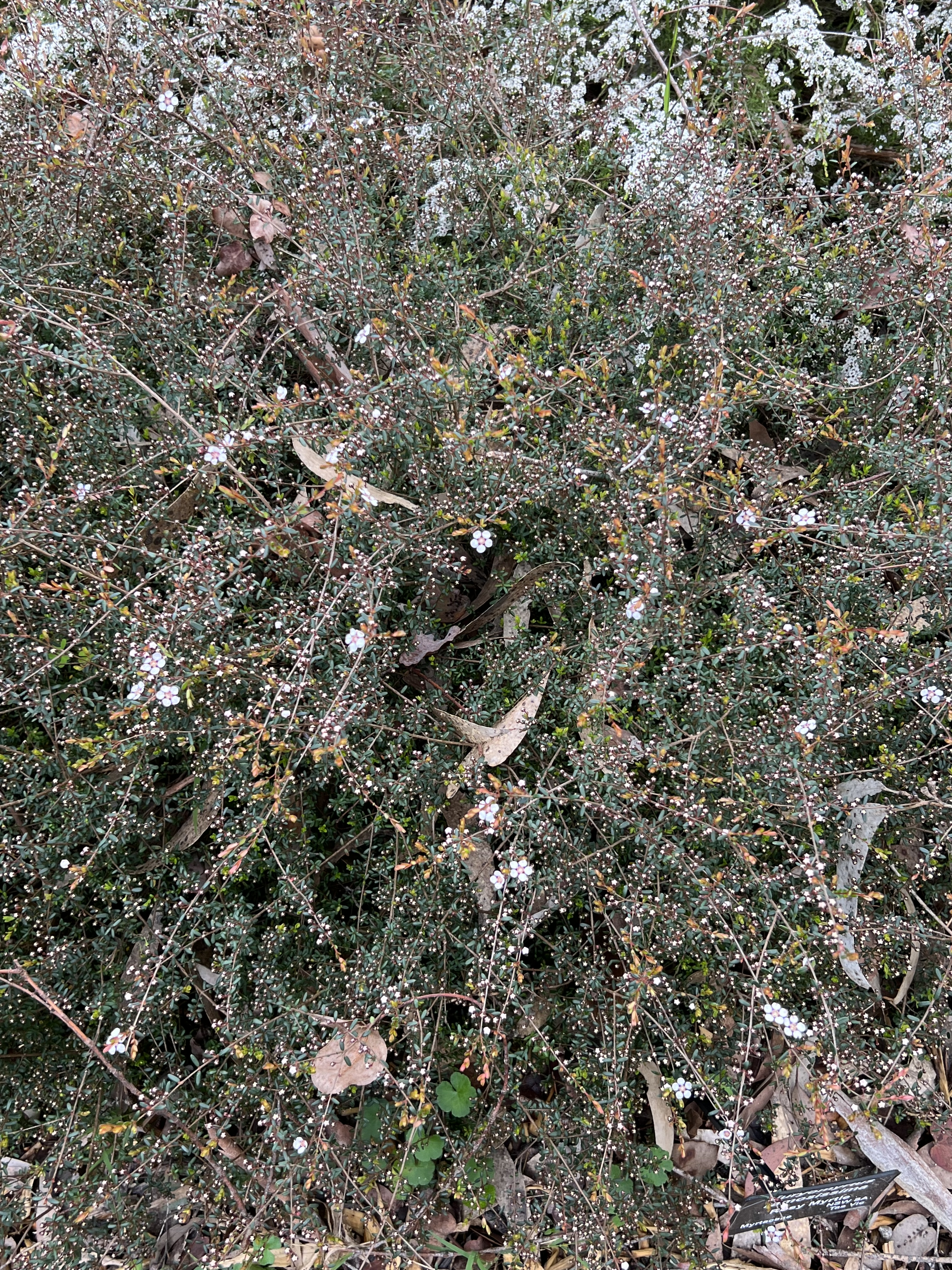
Habit

Euryomyrtus ramosissima, the rosy baeckea, is a shrub in the myrtle family (Myrtaceae). The species is endemic to Australia. It is spreading in habit and grows to 60 cm in height. Its leaves are dark green, long and narrow ranging from 3 to 13 mm in length and 1 to 3 mm in width. White, pink or mauve flowers with circular petals are produced between June and February in its native range.

== Taxonomy ==
Two subspecies are currently recognised:

- E. ramosissima subsp. prostrata (Hook.f.) Trudgen (Synonyms: Baeckea prostrata Hook.f., Euryomyrtus parviflora Miq., Baeckea ramosissima subsp. prostrata (Hook.f.) G.W.Carr
- E. ramosissima (A.Cunn.) Trudgen subsp. ramosissima (syn. Baeckea ramosissima).

== Distribution ==
The species occurs in New South Wales, Victoria, Tasmania and South Australia.

== Cultivation ==
The species performs best in a sunny or partially shaded, well-drained position. Plants may be propagated from semi-mature cuttings or seed, though the latter is not readily available
