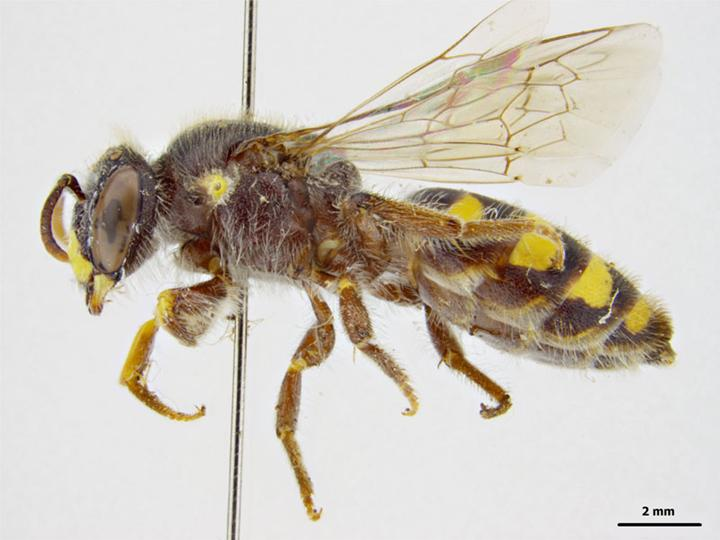
- Female

Scientific classification
- Kingdom: Animalia
- Phylum: Arthropoda
- Clade: Pancrustacea
- Class: Insecta
- Order: Hymenoptera
- Family: Colletidae
- Genus: Euhesma
- Species: E. crabronica

Binomial name
- Euhesma crabronica (Cockerell, 1914)

Synonyms
- Euryglossa crabronica Cockerell, 1914

= Euhesma crabronica =

Species of bee

Euhesma crabronica, or Euhesma (Euhesma) crabronica, is a species of bee in the family Colletidae and the subfamily Euryglossinae. It is endemic to Australia. It was described in 1914 by British-American entomologist Theodore Dru Alison Cockerell.

== Description ==
Female body length is 11 mm, wingspan 14.5 mm. Colouring is mainly black and yellow, with some reddish-brown.

Cockerell comments:

I have now to record a bee, just received from the Queensland Museum, which looks at first sight like some Crabronid wasp; so much so that I could hardly believe, until I had examined it with a lens, that it was really a bee […] A very remarkable species, quite unlike any previously known.

== Distribution and habitat ==
The species occurs in eastern Australia. The type locality is Brisbane.

== Behaviour ==
The adults are flying mellivores. Flowering plants visited by the bees include Leptospermum flavescens and Tristania species.

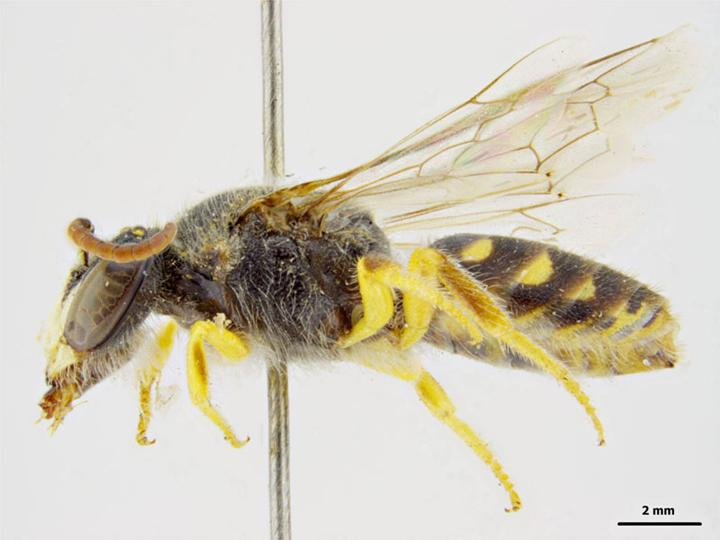
Male
