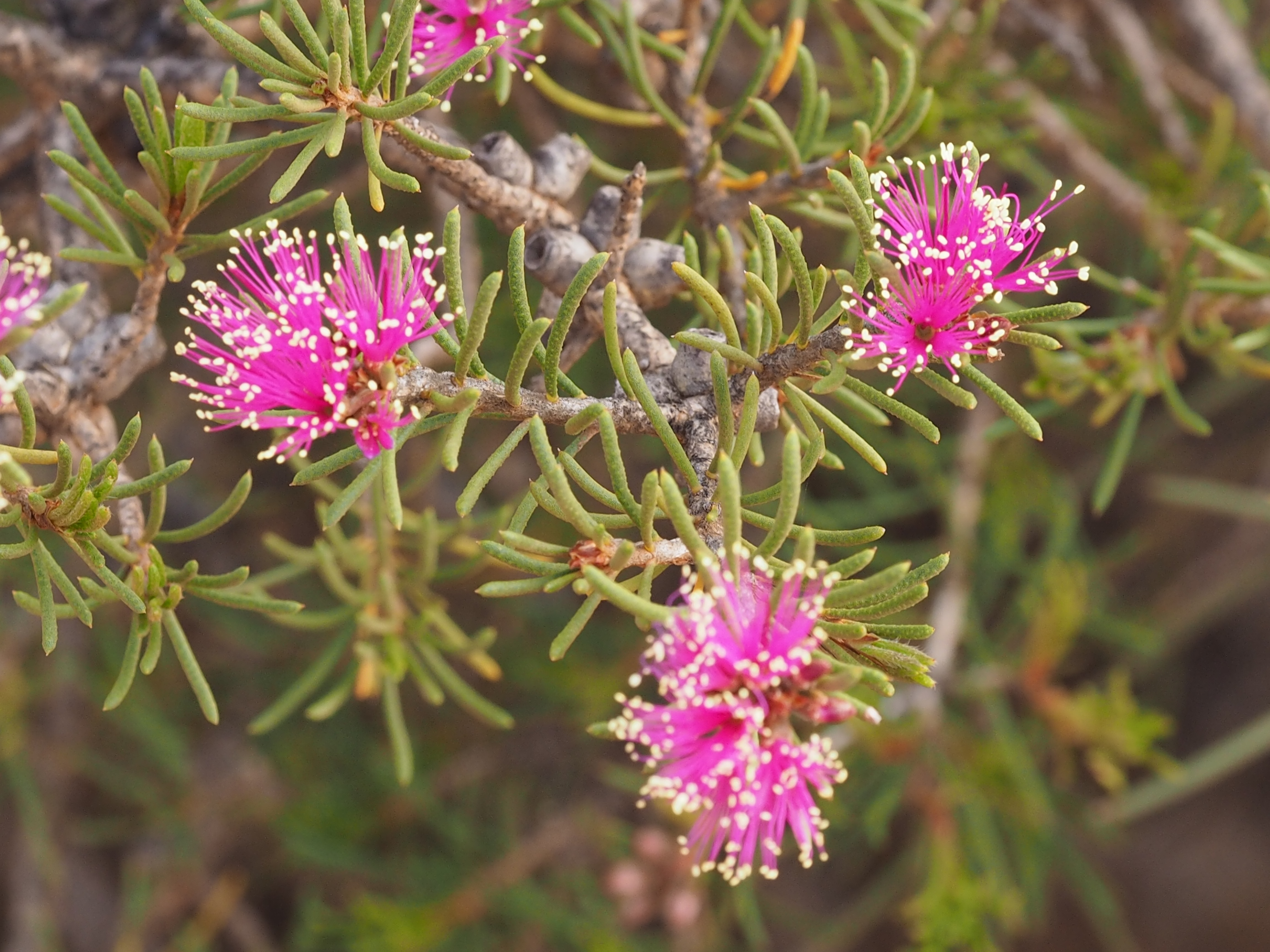
- In Watheroo National Park

Scientific classification
- Kingdom: Plantae
- Clade: Tracheophytes
- Clade: Angiosperms
- Clade: Eudicots
- Clade: Rosids
- Order: Myrtales
- Family: Myrtaceae
- Genus: Melaleuca
- Species: M. calyptroides

Binomial name
- Melaleuca calyptroides Craven

= Melaleuca calyptroides =

Species of flowering plant

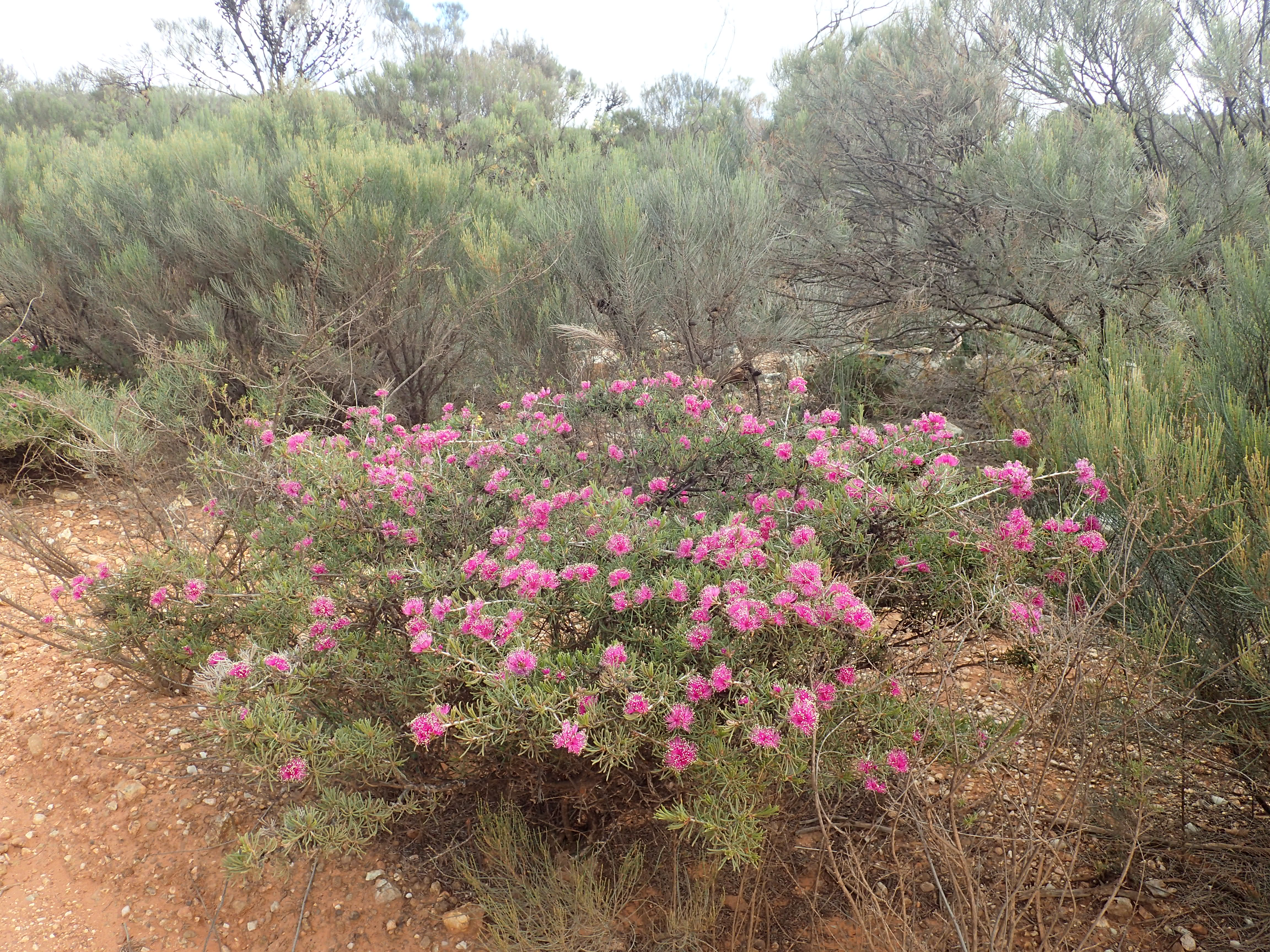
Habit

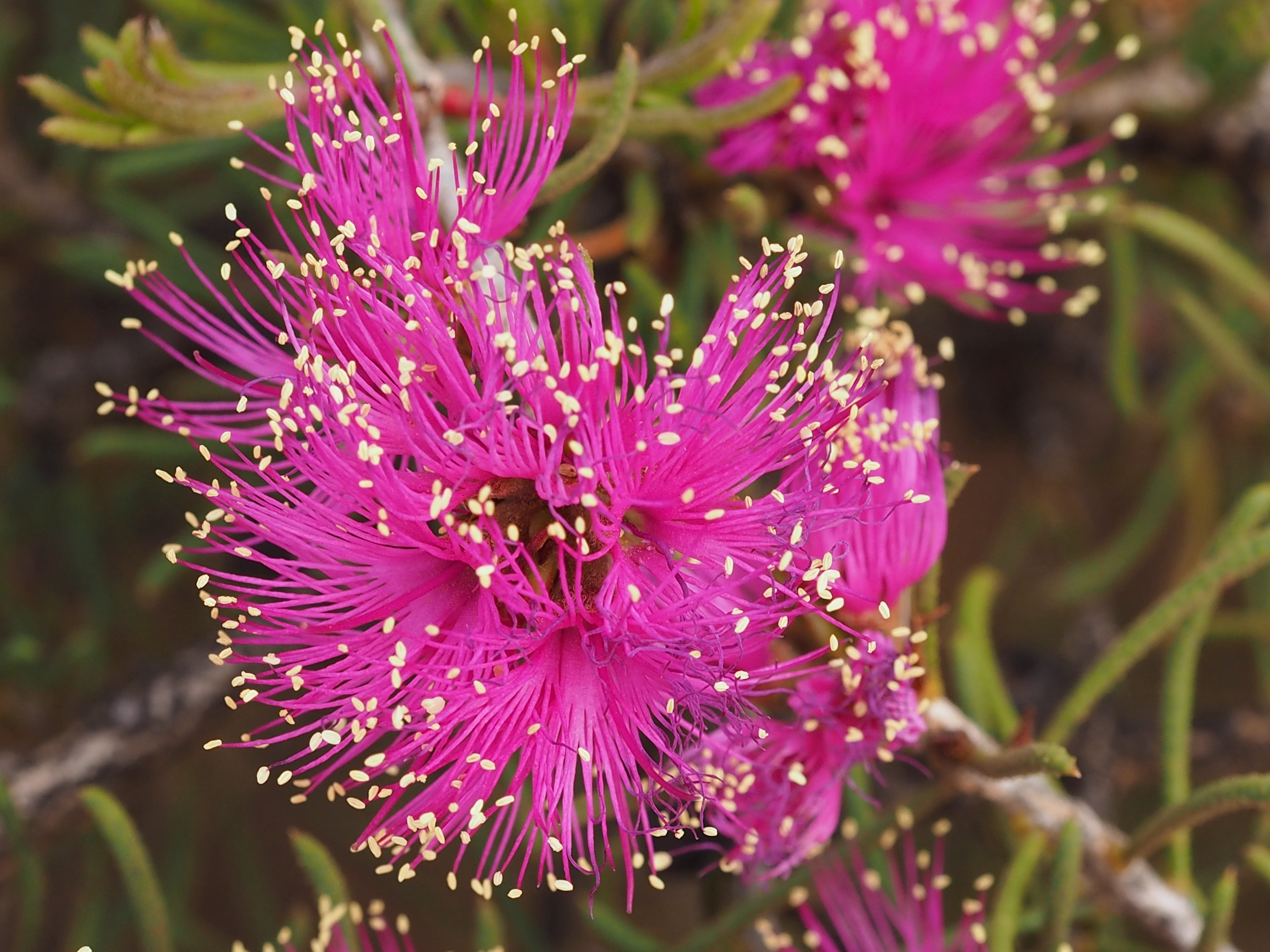
Close-up of flower

Melaleuca calyptroides is a plant in the myrtle family, Myrtaceae and is endemic to the southwest of Western Australia. It is similar to a number of other Western Australian melaleucas such as M. hollidayi with its almost cylindrical leaves, purple pom-pom flower heads and low growth habit but it has longer, wartier leaves and fewer flowers in the inflorescences.

== Description ==
Melaleuca calyptroides is a small, low-growing shrub sometimes reaching a height of 1.5 m (5 ft). Its leaves are arranged alternately, linear in shape, almost circular in cross-section, 5.5–28 mm (0.2–1 in) long, 0.7–1.7 mm (0.03–0.07 in) wide with a leaf stalk the same width as the leaf blade. Most of the leaves are densely covered with distinct, raised oil glands.

The flowers are a shade of pink to purple and appear singly or in small heads on the ends of branches which continue to grow after flowering, sometimes also in the upper leaf axils. The heads are up to 30 mm (1 in) in diameter and contain 1 or 2 groups of flowers in threes, sometimes up to 9 individual flowers. The petals are 2–5.5 mm (0.08–0.2 in) long, and fall off the flower as it opens. The stamens are arranged in bundles of five around the flower, usually with 8 to 15 stamens in each bundle. The flowering season extends from July to November and is followed by fruit which are woody capsules, 3.5–6 mm (0.1–0.2 in) long. The floral cup and woody capsule from which it develops are longer than those of similar melaleucas.

== Taxonomy and naming ==
Melaleuca calyptroides was first formally described in 1999 by Lyndley Craven and Brendan Lepschi in Australian Systematic Botany from a specimen found 94 km (60 mi) east of Southern Cross. The specific epithet (calyptroides) is from the Ancient Greek word kalypto meaning "cover" or "conceal", hence "calyptra". The ending -oides is a Latin suffix meaning "resembling" or "having the form of".

== Distribution and habitat ==
This melaleuca occurs in and between the Watheroo, Morawa, Merredin, Hyden and Coolgardie districts in the Avon Wheatbelt, Coolgardie, Geraldton Sandplains, Mallee and Yalgoo biogeographic regions. It grows in heath, scrub and shrubland in clayey sand or loam over laterite.

== Conservation status ==
Melaleuca calyptroides is listed as not threatened by the Government of Western Australia Department of Parks and Wildlife.
