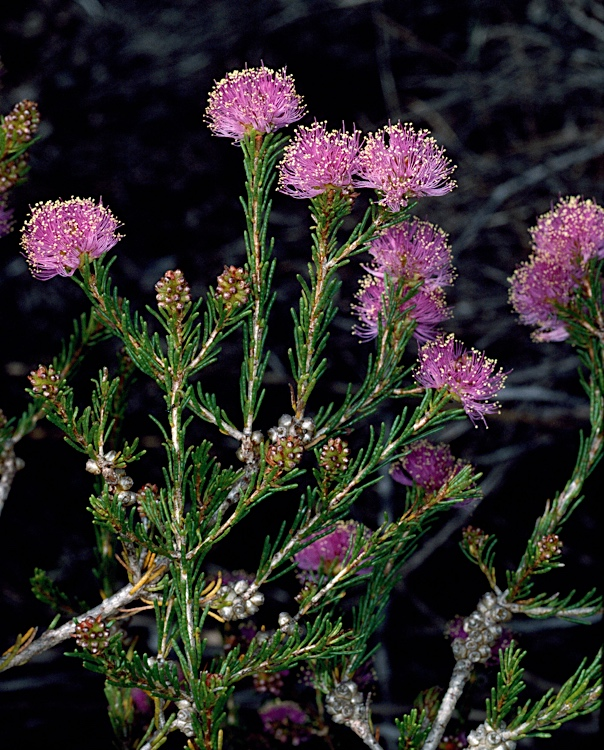
- Near Regans Ford

Scientific classification
- Kingdom: Plantae
- Clade: Tracheophytes
- Clade: Angiosperms
- Clade: Eudicots
- Clade: Rosids
- Order: Myrtales
- Family: Myrtaceae
- Genus: Melaleuca
- Species: M. clavifolia

Binomial name
- Melaleuca clavifolia Craven

= Melaleuca clavifolia =

Species of shrub

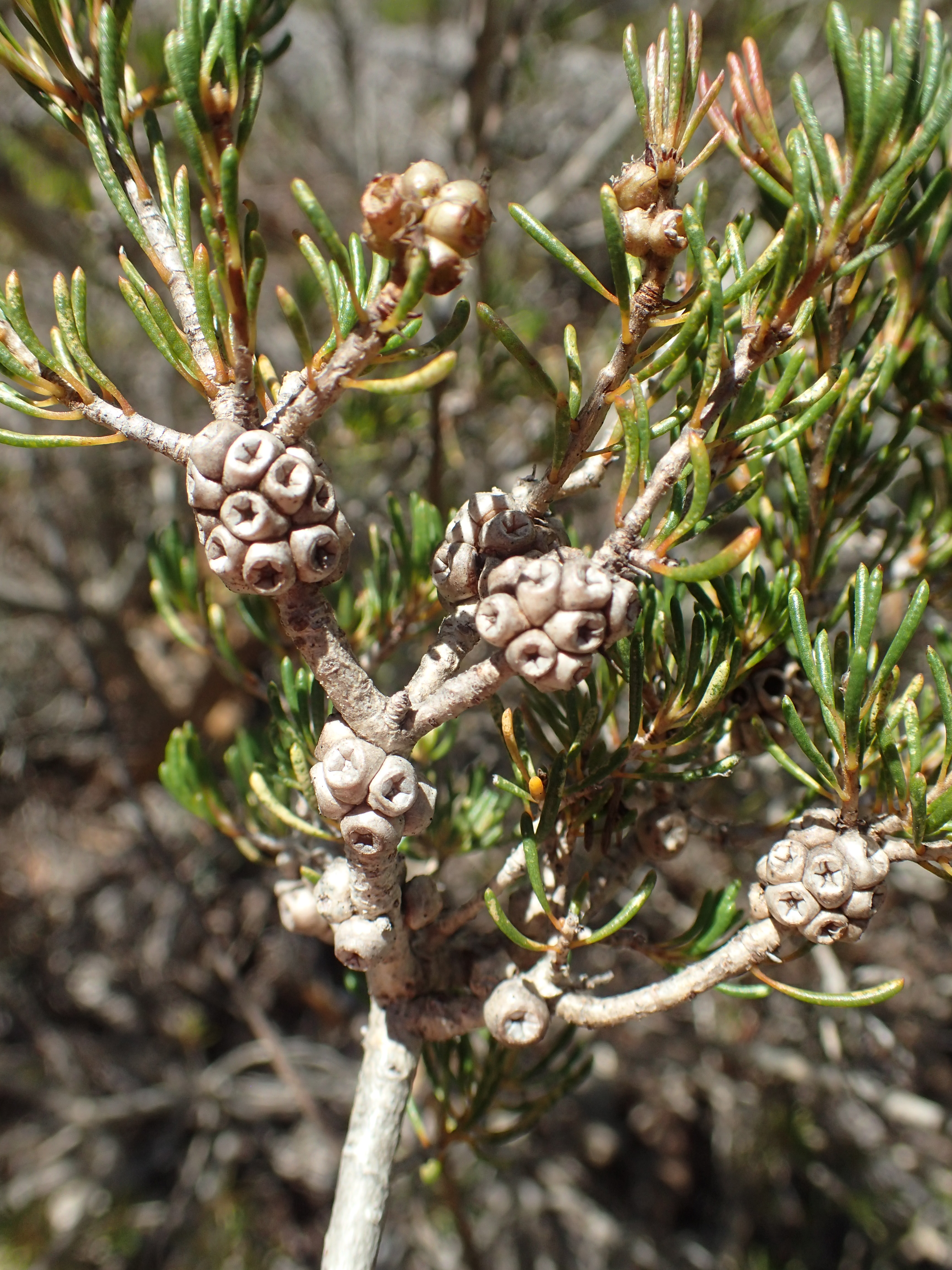
Fruit in the Wannamal Nature Reserve

Melaleuca clavifolia is a plant in the myrtle family, Myrtaceae and is endemic to the south-west of Western Australia. It is a small shrub similar to Melaleuca tinkeri, with "pom-pom" heads of pinkish flowers and soft, silky hairs on the new growth but it has larger flower heads and its leaves are shorter, more club-shaped and have less distinct oil glands.

== Description ==
Melaleuca clavifolia is a small, spreading shrub sometimes growing to a height of 1 m (3 ft). Its young growth is covered with soft, silky hairs some of which persist in the mature leaves and branches. The leaves are arranged alternately, 3.8–10 mm (0.1–0.4 in) long, 0.5–0.9 mm (0.02–0.04 in) wide, narrow egg-shaped with the end wider than the base, and the base tapering to the same width as the stalk.

The flowers are a shade of pink to purple and are arranged in heads or short spikes on the ends of branches which continue to grow after flowering, sometimes also in the upper leaf axils. The heads are up to 23 mm (0.9 in) in diameter and contain 4 to 9 groups of flowers in threes. The petals are 1.3–2.2 mm (0.05–0.09 in) long and fall off as the flower ages. The stamens are arranged in bundles of five around the flower, with 5 to 7 stamens in each bundle. The flowering season is mainly in spring and is followed by fruit which are woody capsules, 2–3 mm (0.08–0.1 in) long forming roughly oval clusters around the stem.

== Taxonomy and naming ==
Melaleuca clavifolia was first formally described in 1999 by Lyndley Craven and Brendan Lepschi in Australian Systematic Botany. The specific epithet (clavifolia) is from the Latin clava meaning "club" and folium "leaf", in reference to the shape of most of the leaves of this species.

== Distribution and habitat ==
This melaleuca occurs in and between the Coorow, Green Head and Moore River districts in the Geraldton Sandplains and Swan Coastal Plain biogeographic regions. It grows in sand and gravel in lateritic soils on flats and hillsides.

== Conservation status ==
Melaleuca clavifolia is listed as not threatened by the Government of Western Australia Department of Parks and Wildlife.
