= Anna Monro =

Australian botanist (born 1969)

Anna Monro (born 1974) is an Australian botanist, who is working on compiling the Australian Plant Census. Her interests include the taxonomy of the Australian members of the family Polygalaceae, in preparation for their inclusion in the Flora of Australia. She is the leader for the "Communications and Outreach" program at the Centre for Australian National Biodiversity Research. From 2004 to 2008, she served as treasurer of the Australasian Systematic Botany Society (ASBS) and, as of 2024, is its publicity officer. She was awarded life membership of the ASBS in 2024.

Her name, along with that of Brendan Lepschi is honoured in the name of the species of flowering plant, Goodenia brendannarum.
