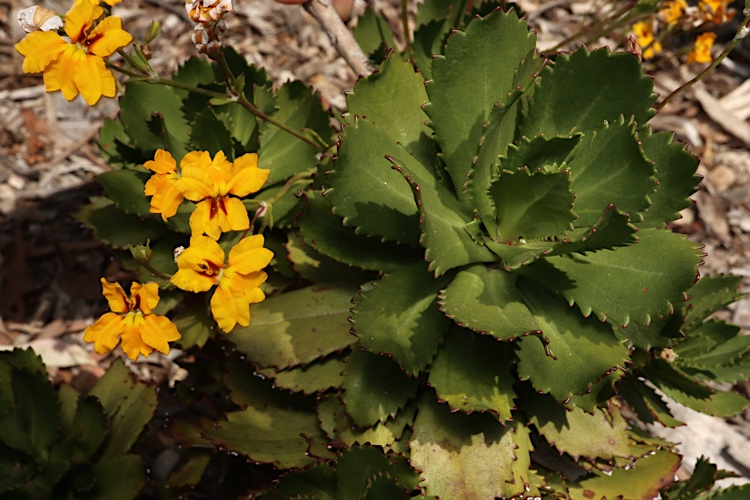
- In Mount Annan Botanic Garden

Scientific classification
- Kingdom: Plantae
- Clade: Tracheophytes
- Clade: Angiosperms
- Clade: Eudicots
- Clade: Asterids
- Order: Asterales
- Family: Goodeniaceae
- Genus: Goodenia
- Species: G. brendannarum

Binomial name
- Goodenia brendannarum K.A.Sheph.
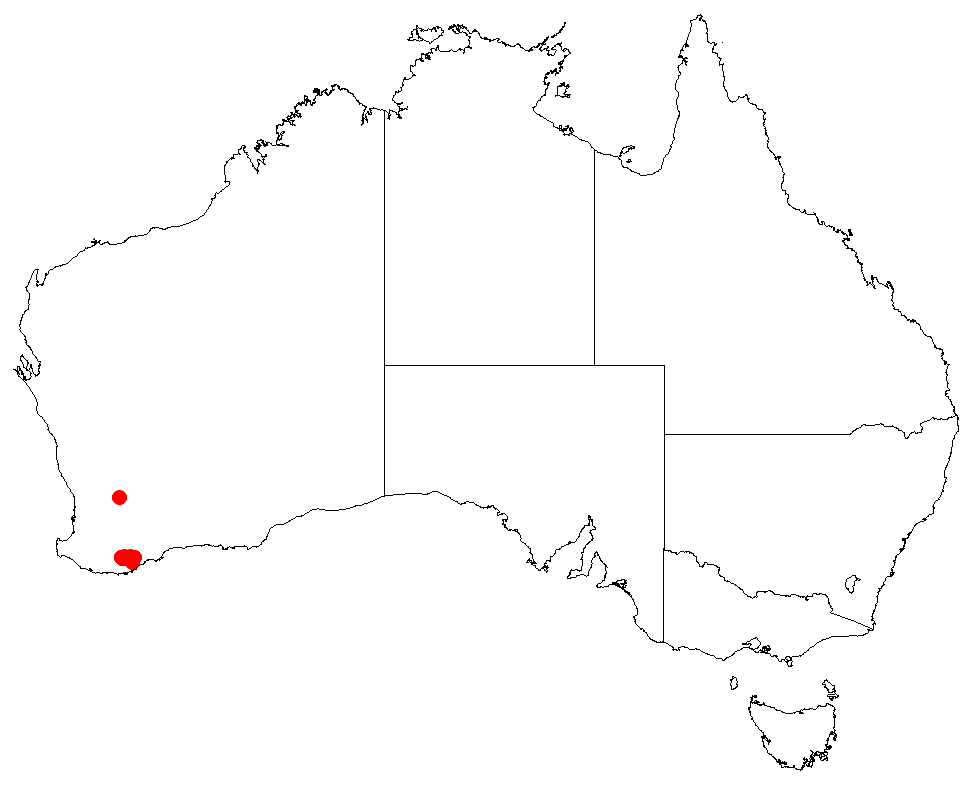
- Occurrence data from AVH

Synonyms
- Velleia foliosa (Benth.) K.Krause; Velleia macrophylla var. foliosa Benth.

= Goodenia brendannarum =

Species of flowering plant

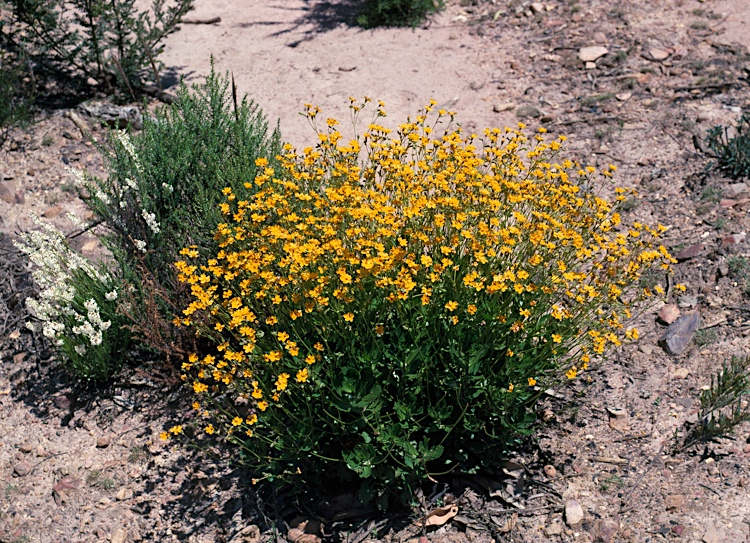
Habit in the Stirling Range National Park

Goodenia brendannarum is a species of flowering plant in the family Goodeniaceae, and is endemic to a small area in the south-west of Western Australia. It is a perennial herb with woody stems, crowded, narrowly egg-shaped leaves with toothed edges, and erect flowering stems and orange-yellow and red flowers.

== Description ==
Goodenia brendannarum is a more or less glabrous, perennial herb with erect stems up to 30 cm (12 in) long. Its leaves are sessile and crowded, egg-shaped with the narrower end towards the base, 40–70 mm (1.6–2.8 in) long and 10–15 mm (0.39–0.59 in) wide with toothed edges. The flowers are borne on a flowering stem up to 200 mm (7.9 in) long with linear bracteoles up to 13 mm (0.51 in) long at the base. The lower sepal is about 5 mm (0.20 in) long, and the petals are orange-yellow and red, about 12 mm (0.47 in) long and hairy, with wings about 2 mm (0.079 in) wide almost to the base of the lower sepal. Flowering mainly occurs from October to December and the fruit contains up to 4 seeds about 2 mm (0.079 in) long.

== Taxonomy ==
This species was first formally described in 1912 by George Bentham who gave it the name Velleia macrophylla var. foliosa in his Flora Australiensis from specimens collected by James Drummond from the summit of the Stirling Range. In 2020, Kelly Anne Shepherd and others transferred it to the genus Goodenia but the name G. foliosa was unavailable as it was preoccupied by a species described by Karel Domin. Shepherd named the new species G. brendannarum in honour of Brendan Lepschi and Anna Monro in recognition of their service to the botanical community.

== Distribution and habitat ==
Goodenia brendannarum grows in rocky places in the Stirling Range in the south-west of Western Australia.
