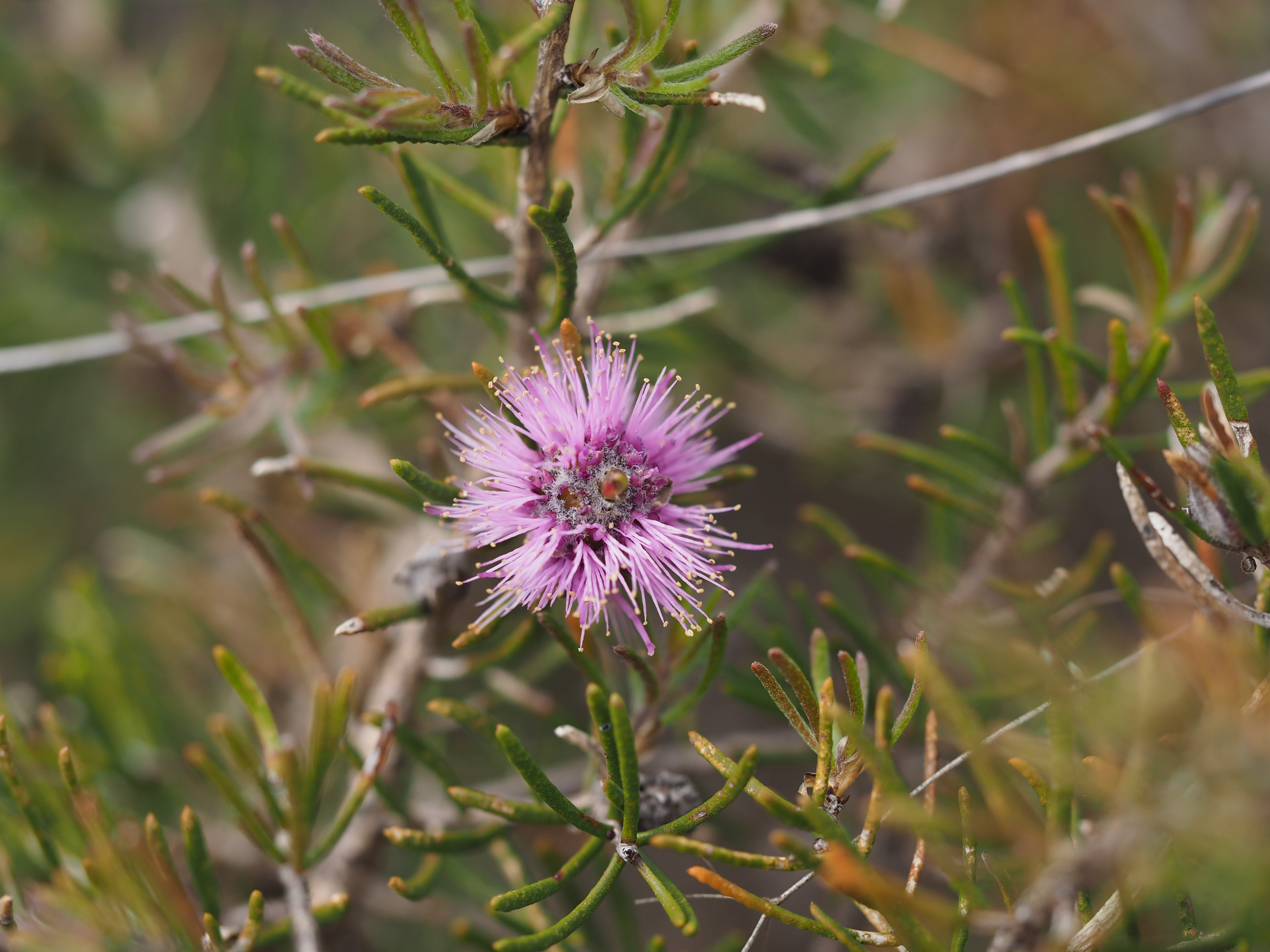

Scientific classification
- Kingdom: Plantae
- Clade: Embryophytes
- Clade: Tracheophytes
- Clade: Spermatophytes
- Clade: Angiosperms
- Clade: Eudicots
- Clade: Rosids
- Order: Myrtales
- Family: Myrtaceae
- Genus: Melaleuca
- Species: M. tinkeri

Binomial name
- Melaleuca tinkeri Craven

= Melaleuca tinkeri =

Species of flowering plant

Melaleuca tinkeri is a plant in the myrtle family, Myrtaceae and is endemic to the south-west of Western Australia. It is one of the smallest melaleucas and is distinguished by its warty, hairy leaves, heads of pinkish flowers in late winter to spring and its spherical fruiting clusters.

== Description ==
Melaleuca tinkeri is a shrub rarely growing to more than 1 m (3 ft) tall. Its leaves are arranged alternately and are 8–34 mm (0.3–1 in) long, 0.6–1.5 mm (0.02–0.06 in) wide, linear to narrow egg-shaped with the narrower end at the base. The younger leaves are covered with soft, silky hairs and the oil glands are raised, giving the leaves a warty appearance.

The flowers are pinkish to purple and are arranged in heads on the ends of branches which continue to grow after flowering and sometimes also in the upper leaf axils. The heads are up to 17 mm (0.7 in) in diameter with 4 to 12 groups of flowers in threes. The petals are 1.0–1.5 mm (0.04–0.06 in) long and fall off as the flower matures. The outer surface of the floral cup (the hypanthium) is hairy and there are five bundles of stamens around the flower, each with 3 to 6 stamens. Flowering occurs from July to October and is followed by fruit which are woody capsules, 2.5–3.0 millimetres (0.098–0.12 in) long, packed tightly together in spherical or oblong clusters.

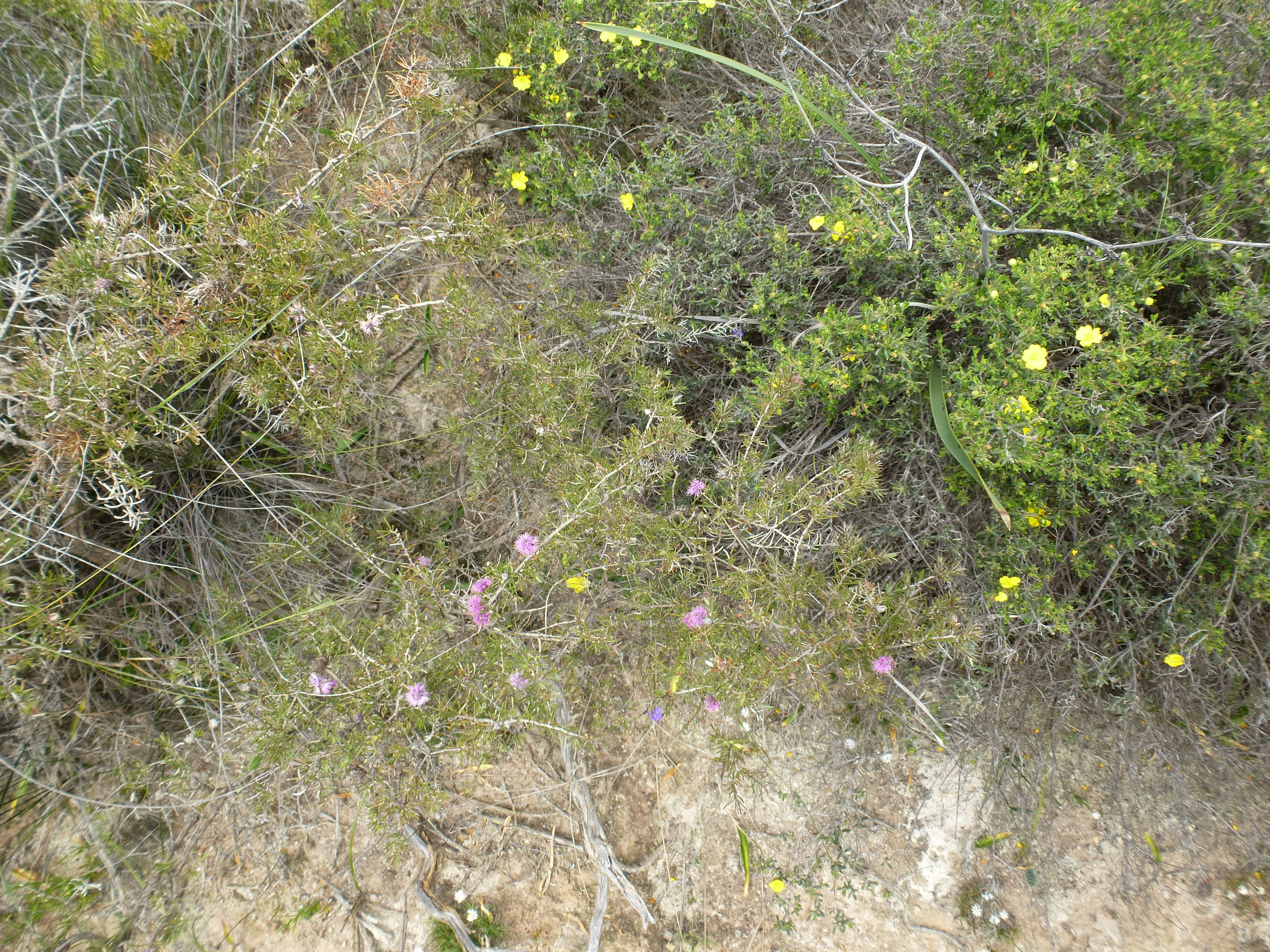
Habit near Dongara

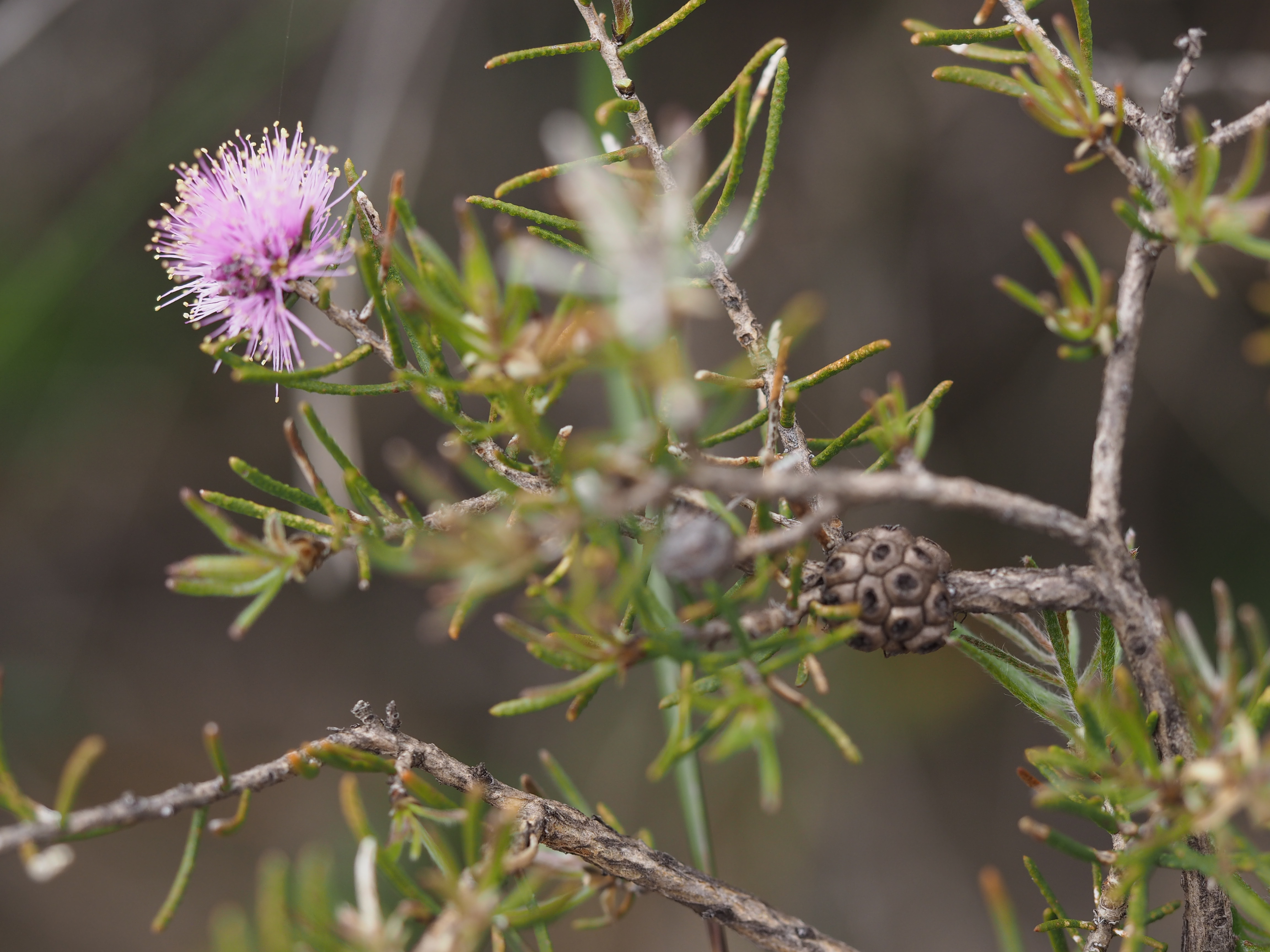
Fruit

== Taxonomy and naming ==
Melaleuca tinkeri was first formally described in 1999 by Lyndley Craven in Australian Systematic Botany from a specimen collected 7 km (4 mi) east of Eneabba. The specific epithet (tinkeri) honours Allan Tinker for his knowledge of the flora of the Eneabba area.

== Distribution and habitat ==
This melaleuca occurs in the Nandanooka and Lesueur National Park areas in the Avon Wheatbelt and Geraldton Sandplains biogeographic regions. It grows in shallow, gravelly sand over laterite or granite.

== Conservation ==
Melaleuca tinkeri is listed as not threatened by the Government of Western Australia Department of Parks and Wildlife.
