= Brendan Lepschi =

Australian botanist (born 1969)

Brendan John Lepschi (born 1969) is an Australian botanist, whose interests include the taxonomy of the genus Melaleuca, the families Santalaceae and Goodeniaceae and how exotic species become naturalised.

He is the curator of the Australian National Herbarium at the Australian National Botanic Gardens which currently hold 1.2 million plant specimens. Lepschi is one of 3 editors of Census of the Vascular Plants, Hornworts, Liverworts and Slime Moulds of the Australian Capital Territory and the author or co-author of many taxonomic papers.
