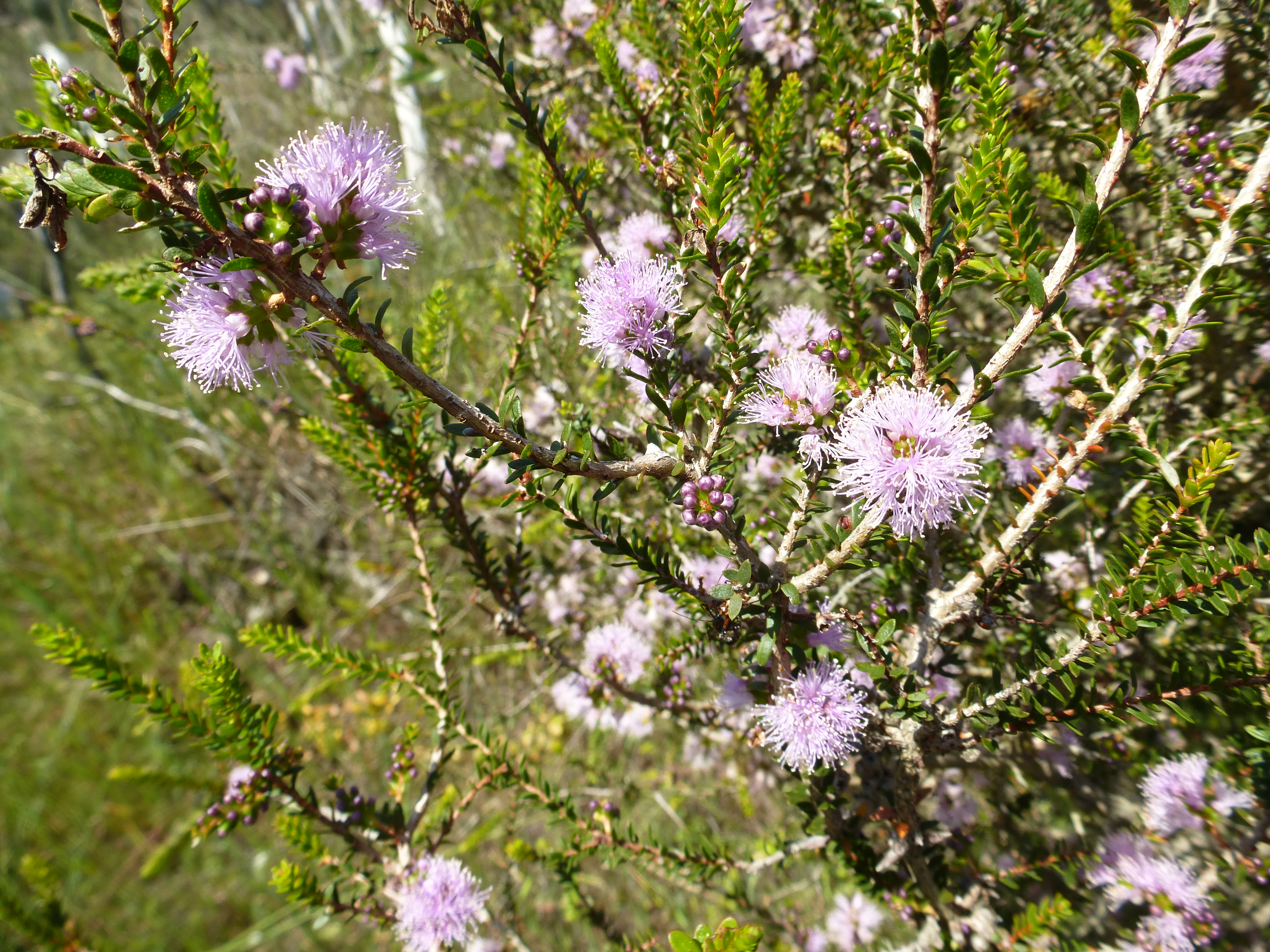

Scientific classification
- Kingdom: Plantae
- Clade: Tracheophytes
- Clade: Angiosperms
- Clade: Eudicots
- Clade: Rosids
- Order: Myrtales
- Family: Myrtaceae
- Genus: Melaleuca
- Species: M. camptoclada

Binomial name
- Melaleuca camptoclada F.C.Quinn

= Melaleuca camptoclada =

Species of shrub

Melaleuca camptoclada is a shrub in the myrtle family, Myrtaceae and is endemic to the south-west of Western Australia. It was first described in 1990 in a review of the genus Melaleuca when the species Melaleuca laxiflora at that time was found to comprise ten species. Two of those species were new - M. camptoclada and M. ctenoides.

== Description ==
Melaleuca camptoclada is a shrub growing to a height of about 3 m (10 ft). Its leaves and branches are glabrous or almost so. The leaves are 2.9–5.5 mm (0.1–0.2 in) long and 1.5–1.8 mm (0.06–0.07 in) wide and elliptical in shape.

The flowers are mauve and are arranged in heads or spikes to 16 mm (0.6 in) in diameter, with 5 to 15 individual flowers. The petals are 1.5–2.4 mm (0.06–0.09 in) long and fall off as the flowers open. The stamens are arranged in five bundles around the flower with 9 to 16 stamens in each bundle. Flowering occurs from September to November and the fruit are woody capsules, 2.5–3.5 mm (0.098–0.14 in) long.

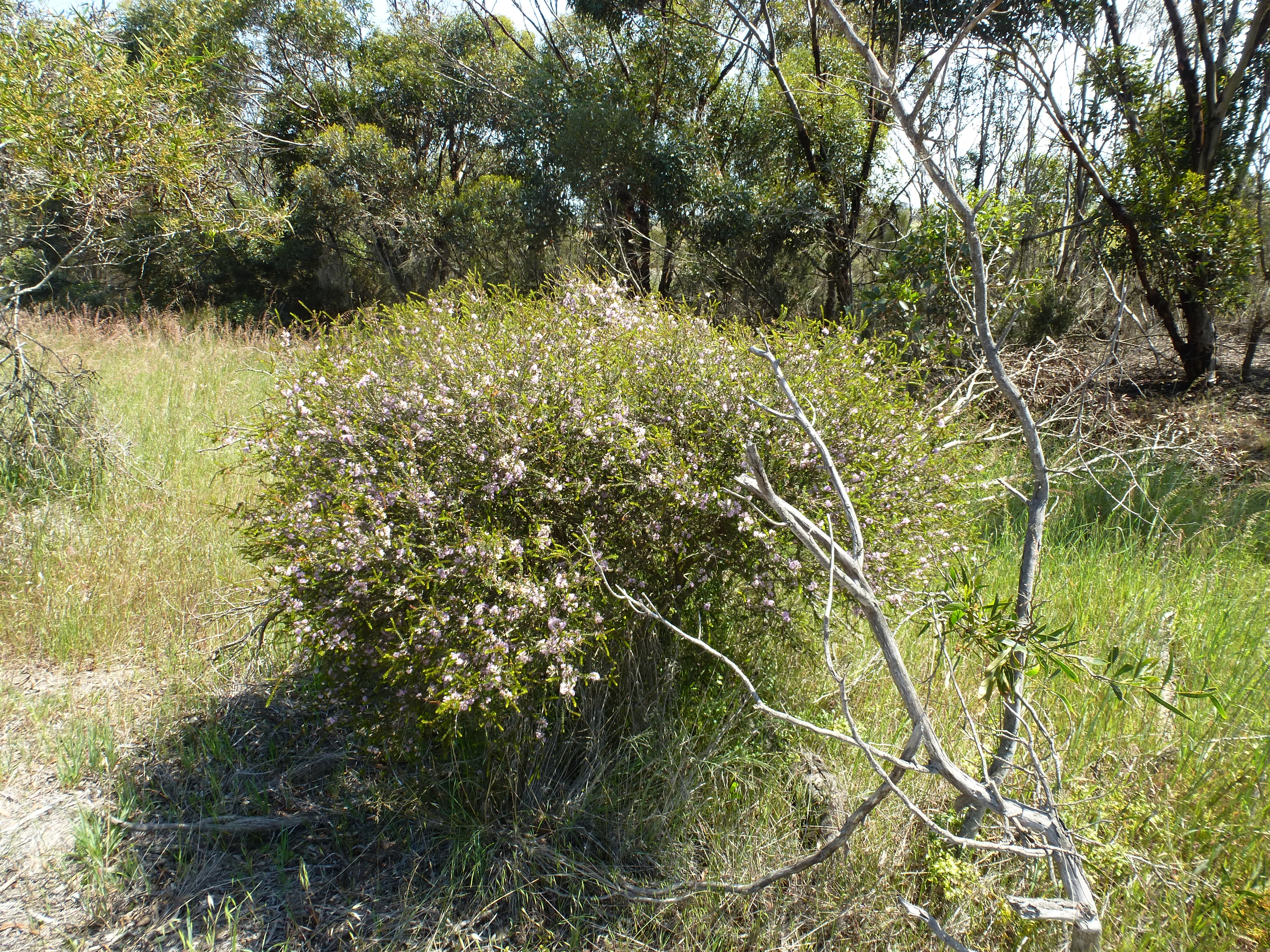
Habit in the Stirling Range National Park

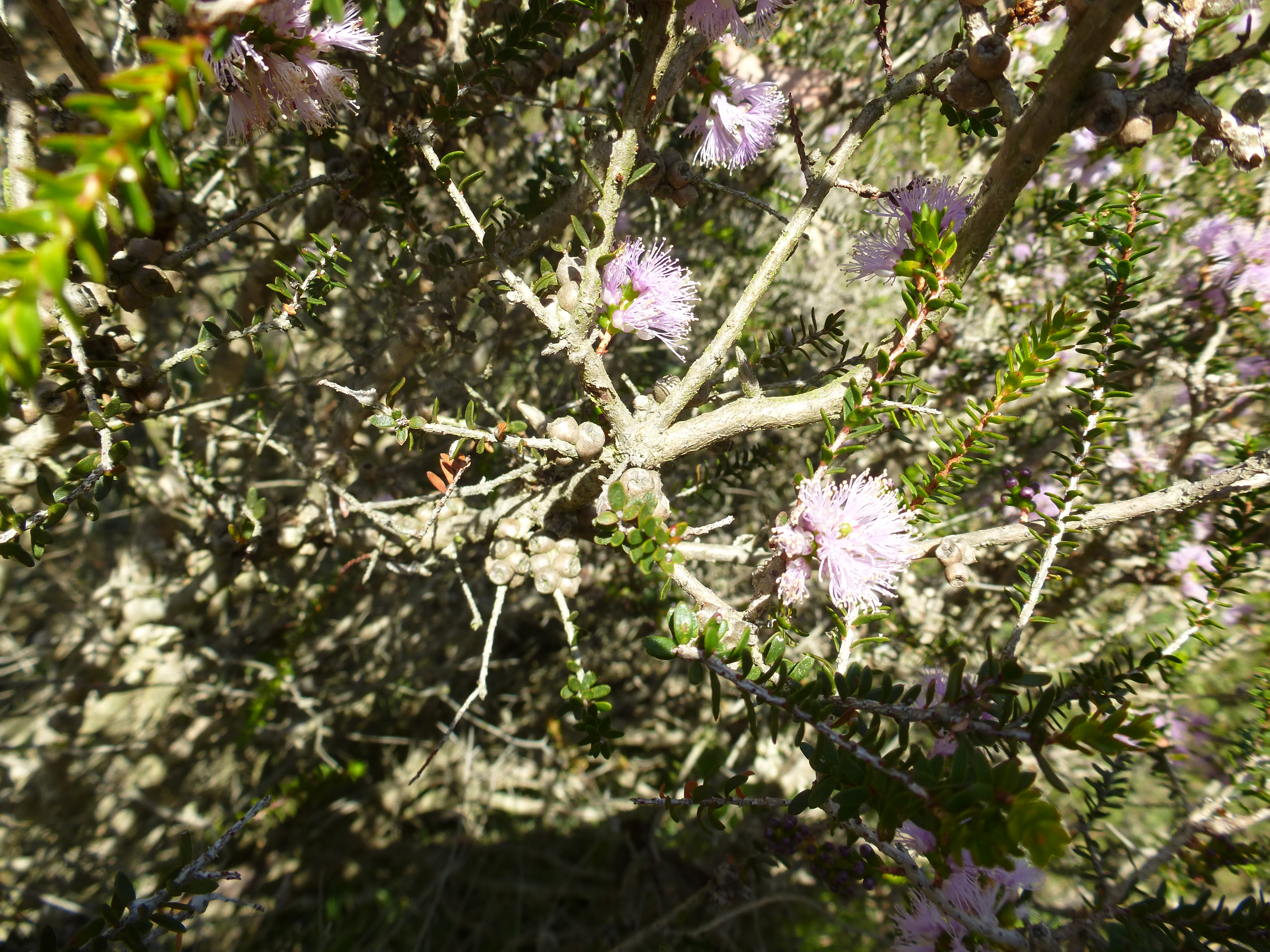
M. camptoclada fruit

== Taxonomy and naming ==
Melaleuca camptoclada was first formally described in 1990 by F.C.Quinn from a specimen found near the Stirling Ranges. The specific epithet (camptoclada) is from the Greek camptos, (flexible or curved) and clados (a shoot or branch), referring to the habit of this species.

== Distribution and habitat ==
This melaleuca occurs in the Esperance Plains, Jarrah Forest and Warren biogeographic regions. It grows in gravelly sand and clay loam.

== Conservation status ==
Melaleuca camptoclada is listed as not threatened by the Government of Western Australia Department of Parks and Wildlife.
