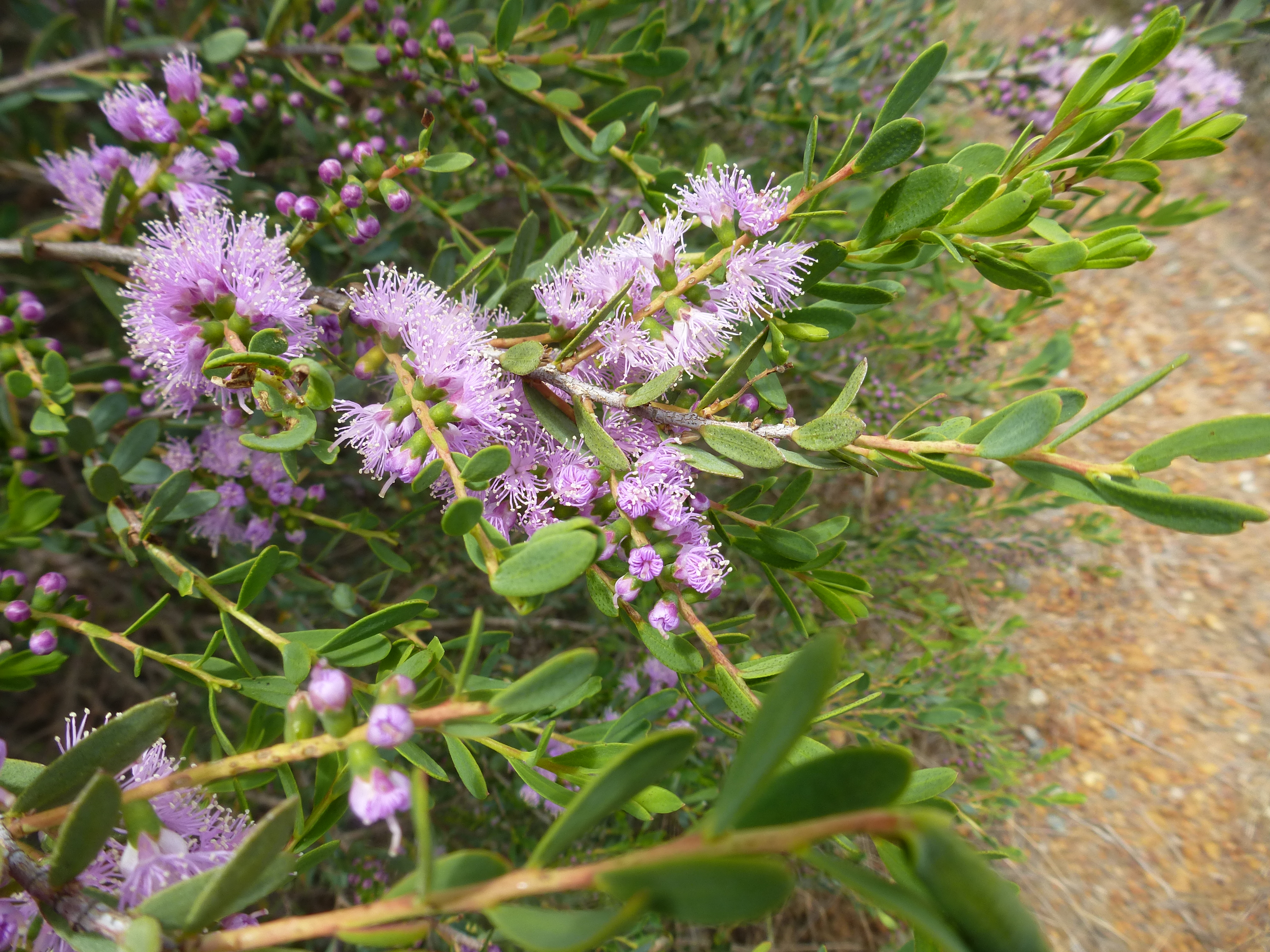

Scientific classification
- Kingdom: Plantae
- Clade: Tracheophytes
- Clade: Angiosperms
- Clade: Eudicots
- Clade: Rosids
- Order: Myrtales
- Family: Myrtaceae
- Genus: Melaleuca
- Species: M. laxiflora

Binomial name
- Melaleuca laxiflora Turcz.

= Melaleuca laxiflora =

Species of shrub

Melaleuca laxiflora, commonly known as narrow-leaved paperbark, is a woody, spreading shrub in the myrtle family, Myrtaceae and is endemic to the south-west of Western Australia. It is distinguished by its loosely arranged, mostly lateral pink flower spikes and its smooth, fleshy, oil-dotted leaves. It is often cultivated because of its hardiness and attractive flowers.

== Description ==
Melaleuca laxiflora is a rounded, open shrub growing to a height and width of 0.5–3 m (2–10 ft) with rough, fibrous bark. Its leaves are arranged alternately along the branches, glabrous, narrow oval to tear-drop shaped, 4.5–28 mm (0.2–1 in) long, 1.5–4 mm (0.06–0.2 in) wide and have prominent oil glands.

The flowers are mauve, pink or purple, sometimes white, in heads of 6 to 20 individual flowers along the sides of the branches. The heads are 20–40 mm (0.8–2 in) long and about 20 mm (0.8 in) in diameter. The stamens are arranged in five bundles around the flower, each bundle with 12 to 18 stamens. Flowers appear mostly from October to December and the fruit which follow are in loose clusters, each capsule cylindrical, 3–5 mm (0.1–0.2 in) long and 3 mm (0.1 in) in diameter, with the sepals remaining as teeth around the edge.

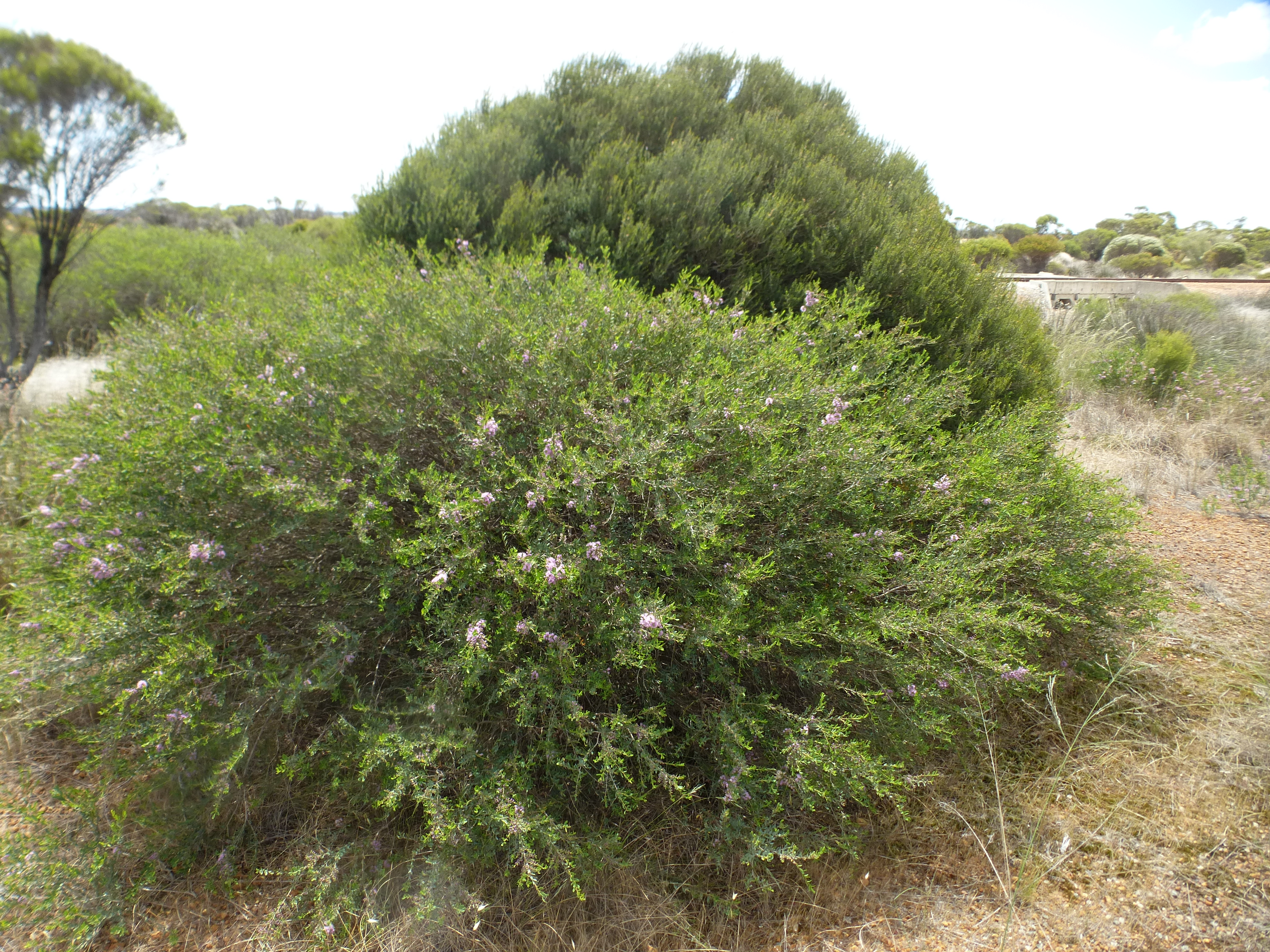
Habit 13 km (8.1 mi) north of Corrigin

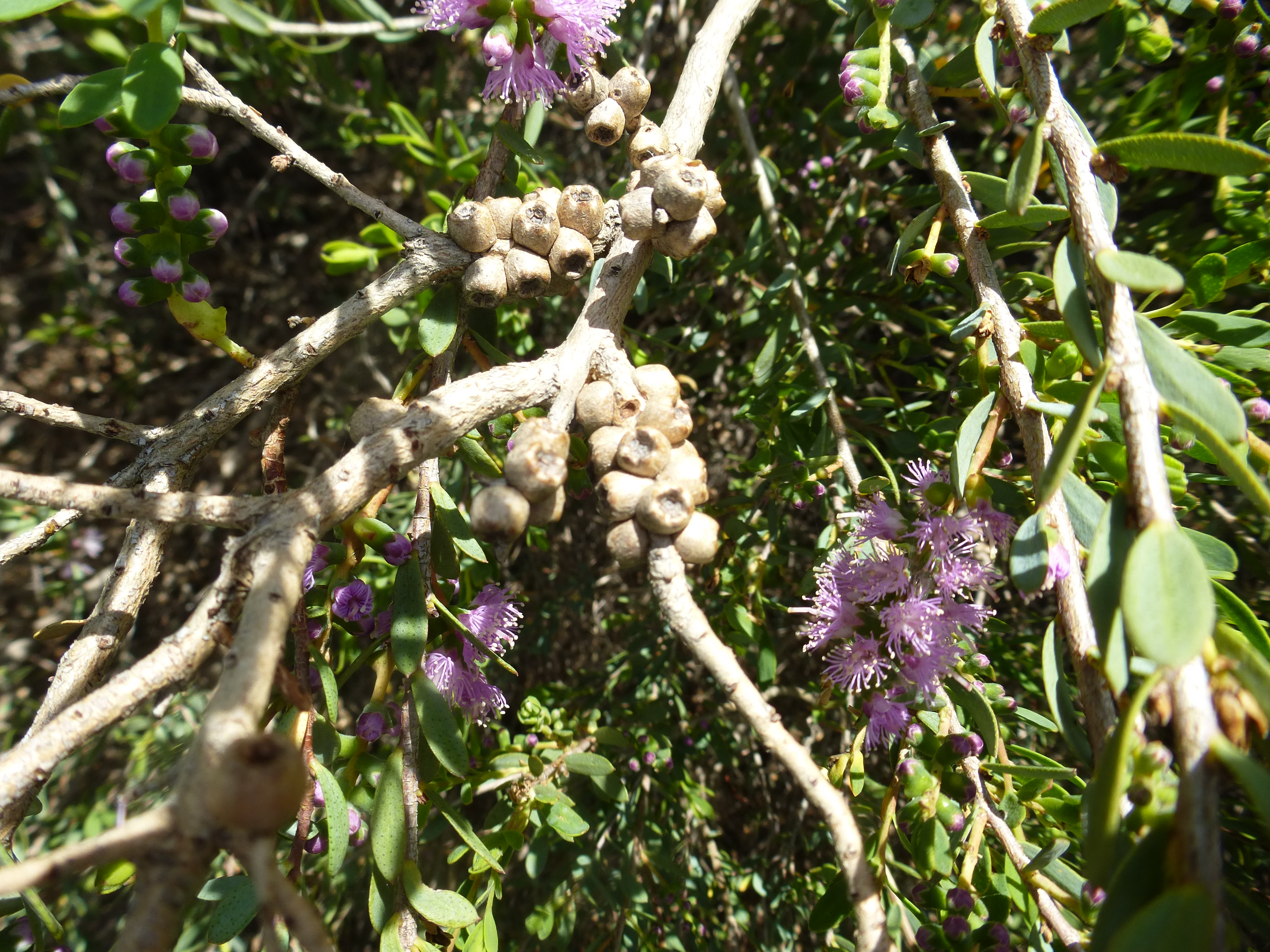
Fruit

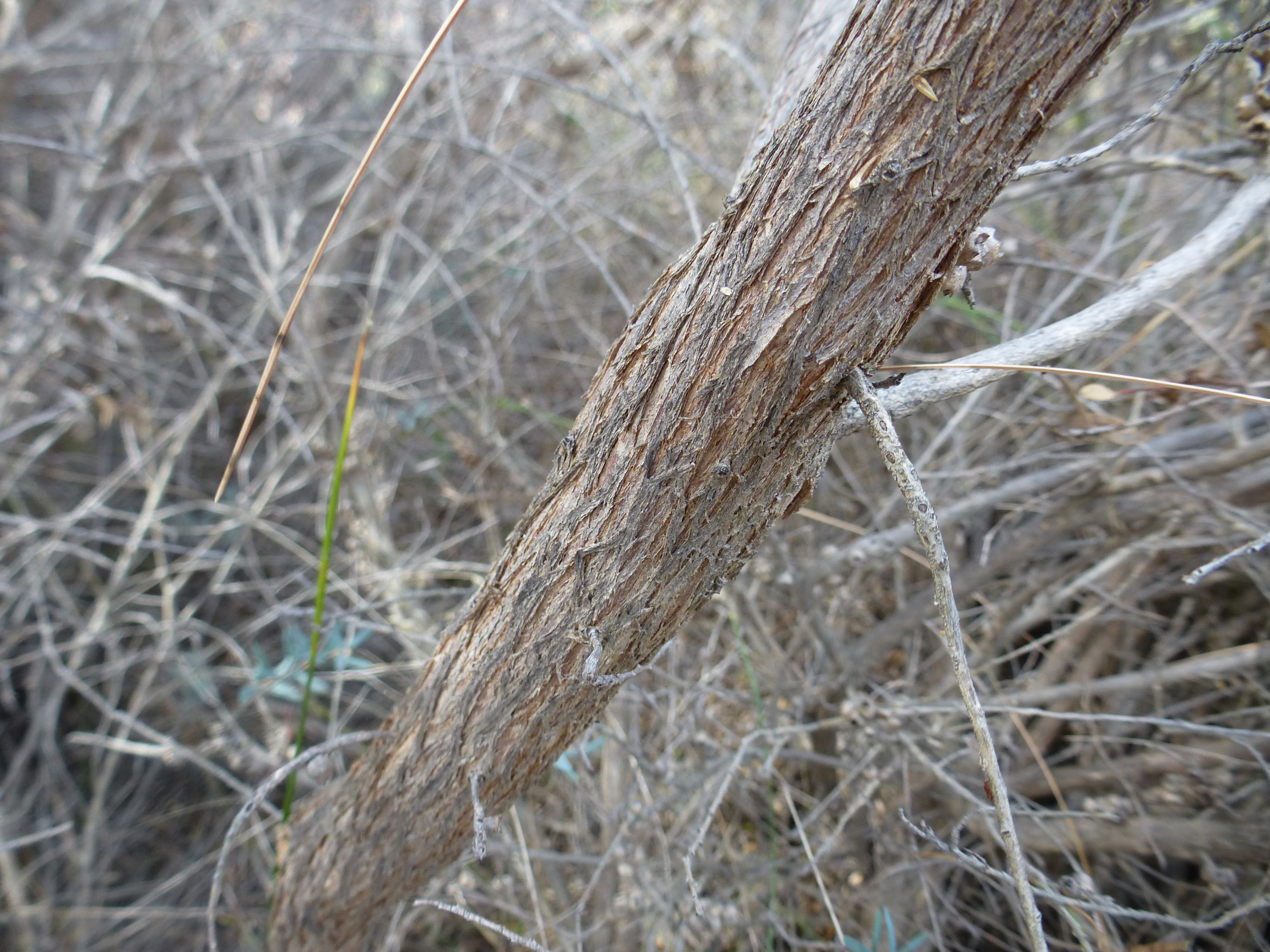
Bark

== Taxonomy and naming ==
Melaleuca laxiflora was first formally described in 1852 by Nikolai Turczaninow in Bulletin de la classe physico-mathematique de l'Academie Imperiale des sciences de Saint-Petersburg. The specific epithet (laxiflora) is from the Latin words laxus, meaning "loose" or slack and -florus meaning "flowered" referring to the relatively wide separation between individual flowers in each spike.

== Distribution and habitat ==
This melaleuca occurs from the Mollerin district, south and east to the Ongerup and Norseman districts in the Avon Wheatbelt, Coolgardie and Mallee biogeographic regions. It grows in sandy or clayey soils, often over granite, on flats and roadsides.

== Conservation status ==
Melaleuca laxiflora is listed as not threatened by the Government of Western Australia Department of Parks and Wildlife.

== Use in horticulture ==
This species has frequently been cultivated and is a hardy plant in a well-drained, sunny position. It is suited to semi-dry and temperate climates rather than humid areas.
