= Ragged Mountain =

Ragged Mountain may refer to the following geographical places in the United States:

== Summits ==
Listed alphabetically by state

- Ragged Mountain (Connecticut), elevation 761 feet (232 m)
- Ragged Mountain (Maine), site of the Camden Snow Bowl ski area
- Ragged Mountain, Berkshire County, Massachusetts, a subordinate peak of Mount Greylock
- Ragged Mountain (New Hampshire), elevation 2,286 feet (697 m)
  - Ragged Mountain Resort, a skiing facility located here
- Ragged Mountain (Utah), elevation 9,113 feet (2,778 m)
- Ragged Mountains, an offshoot of the Blue Ridge Mountains in Virginia

== See also ==
- Mount Ragged, a peak in Cape Arid National Park in Australia
  - Mount Ragged beaufortia, common name of Beaufortia raggedensis, a plant in the myrtle family endemic to this area
- Ragged Peak (disambiguation)
