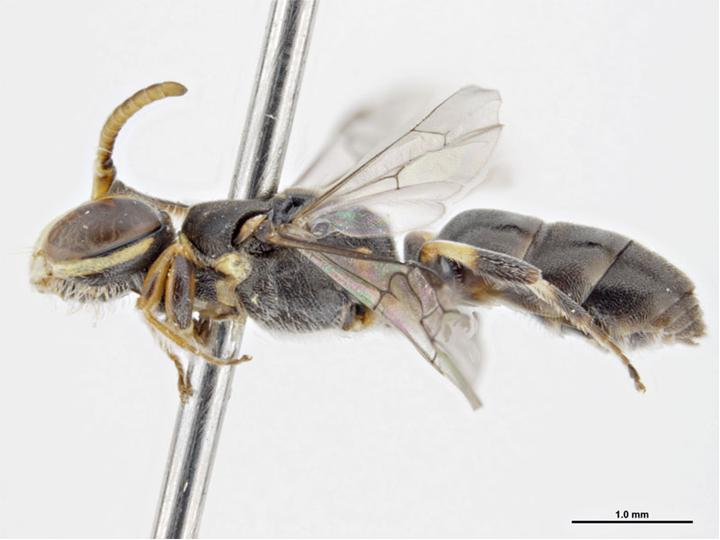
- Female

Scientific classification
- Kingdom: Animalia
- Phylum: Arthropoda
- Clade: Pancrustacea
- Class: Insecta
- Order: Hymenoptera
- Family: Colletidae
- Genus: Hylaeus
- Species: H. greavesi

Binomial name
- Hylaeus greavesi (Rayment, 1935)

Synonyms
- Gnathoprosopis greavesi Rayment, 1935

= Hylaeus greavesi =

Species of bee

Hylaeus greavesi, or Hylaeus (Prosopisteron) greavesi, is a species of bee in the family Colletidae and subfamily Hylaeinae. It is endemic to Australia. It was described by Australian entomologist Tarlton Rayment in 1935.

== Description ==
Male body length is about 5 mm, female 5.5 mm. Integumental colouration is mainly black, with cream to yellow markings.

== Distribution and habitat ==
The species occurs in south-west Western Australia. The type locality is Denmark.

== Behaviour ==
The adults are flying mellivores with territorial males. Flowering plants visited by the bees include Beaufortia species.

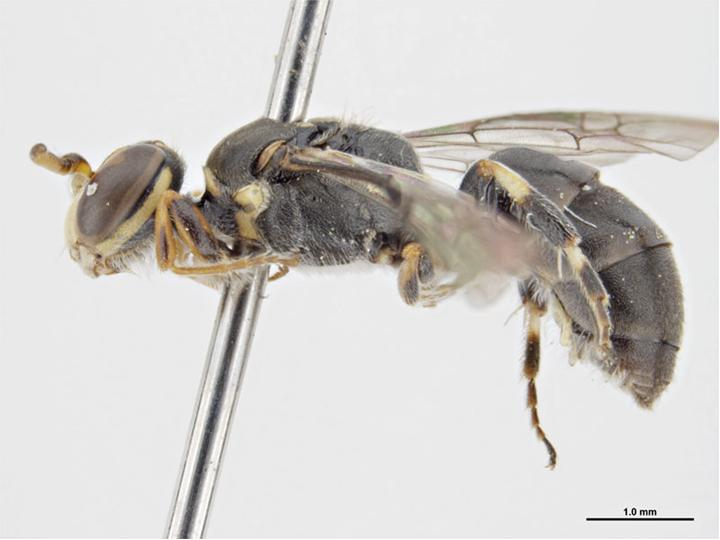
Male
