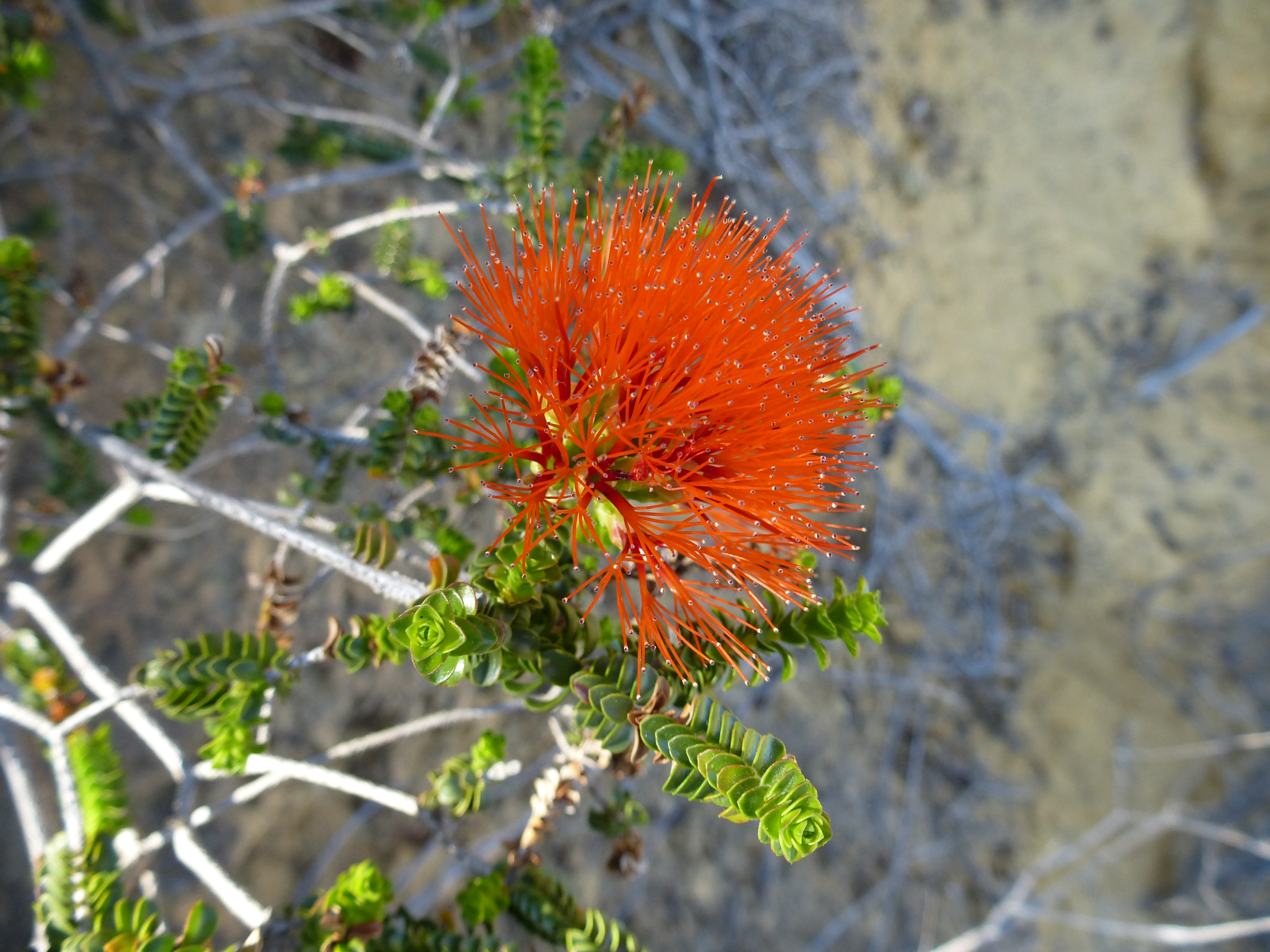
- Beaufortia aestiva (red form)

Scientific classification
- Kingdom: Plantae
- Clade: Tracheophytes
- Clade: Angiosperms
- Clade: Eudicots
- Clade: Rosids
- Order: Myrtales
- Family: Myrtaceae
- Genus: Beaufortia
- Species: B. aestiva

Binomial name
- Beaufortia aestiva K.J.Brooks

Synonyms
- Melaleuca aestiva (K.J.Brooks) Craven & R.D.Edwards

= Beaufortia aestiva =

Kalbarri beaufortia

Species of flowering plant

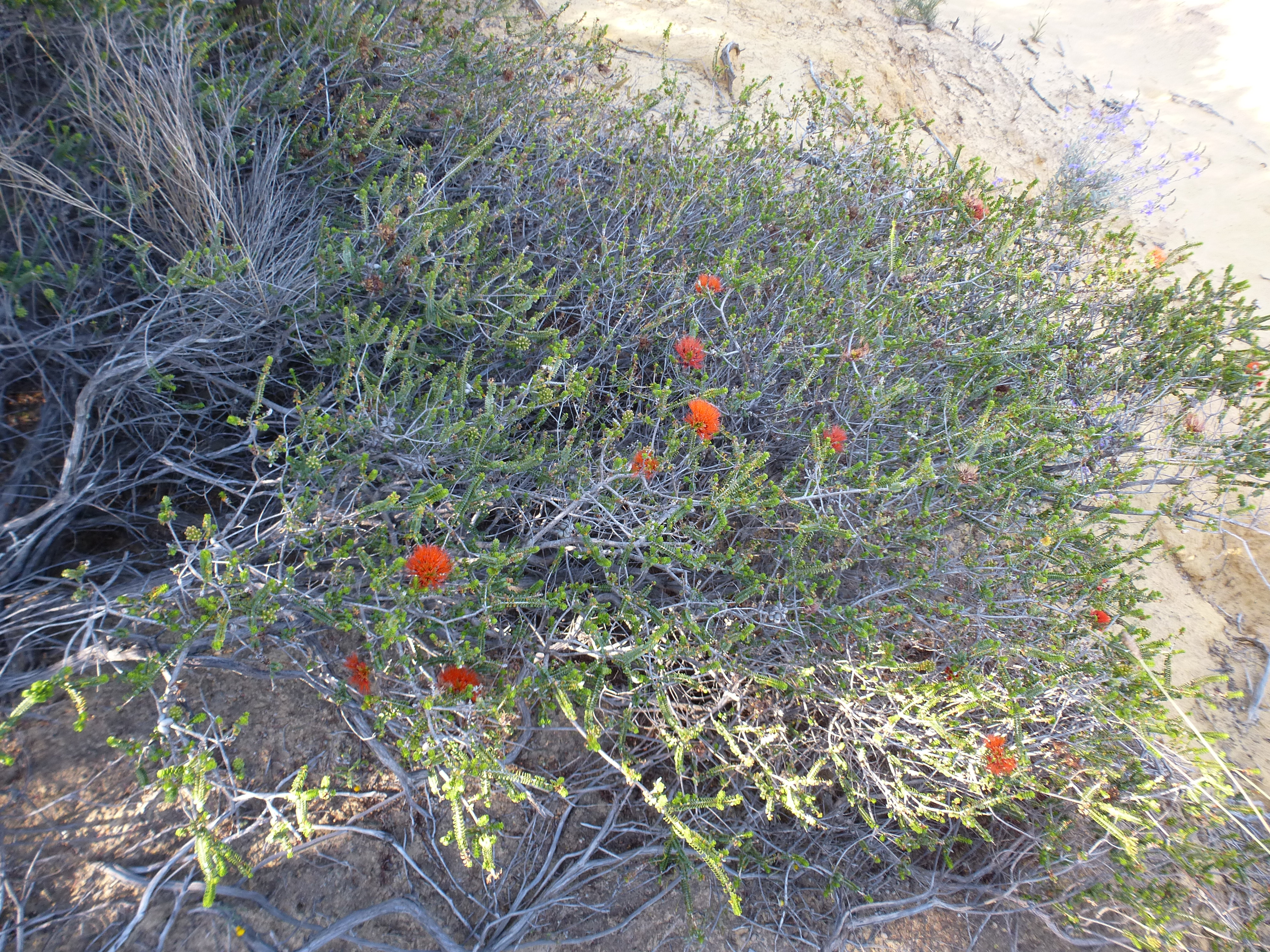
Habit near Binnu

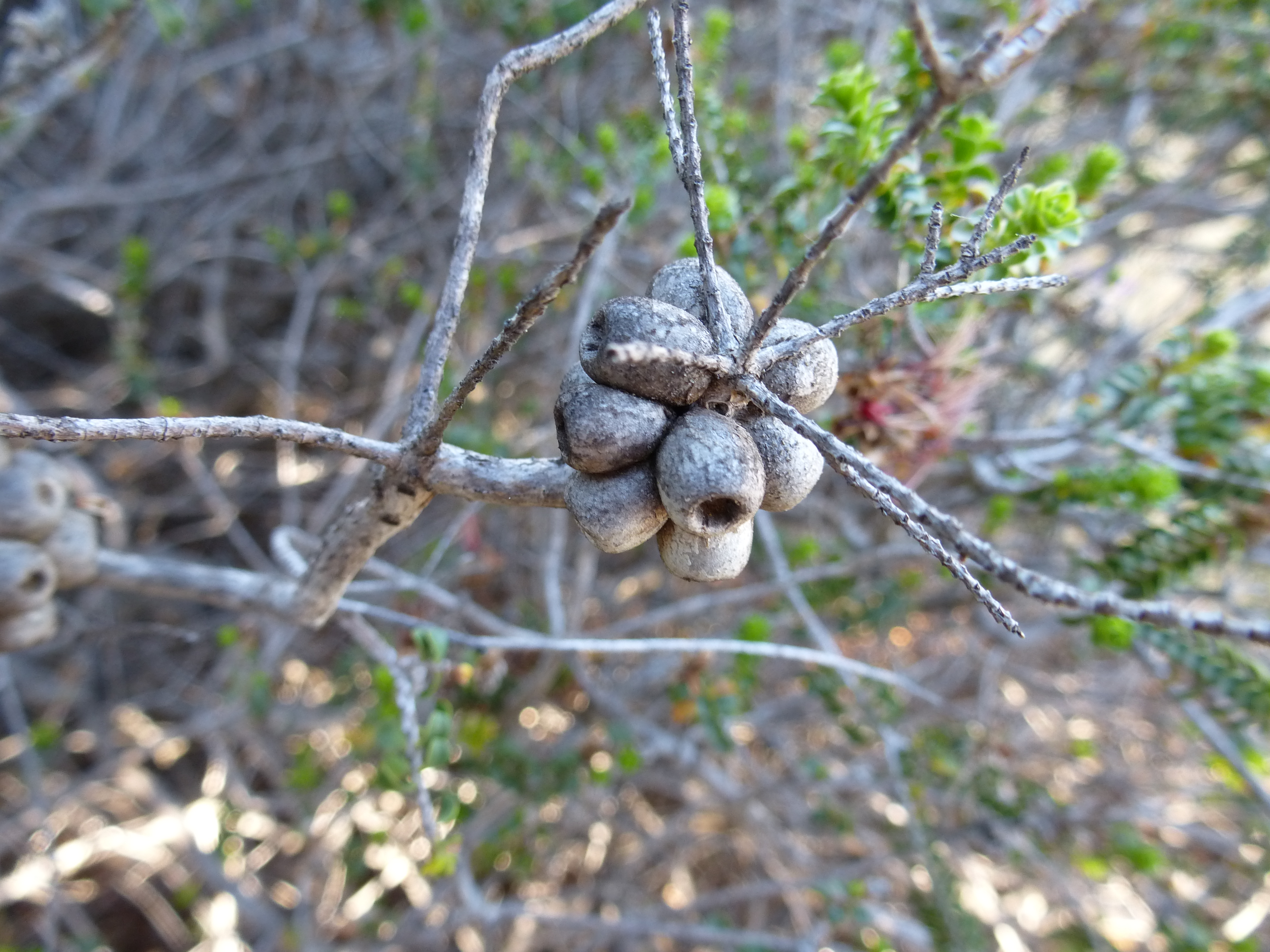
Fruit

Beaufortia aestiva, commonly known as Kalbarri beaufortia, or summer flame, is a plant in the myrtle family, Myrtaceae and is endemic to the southwest of Western Australia. It is a dense, usually rounded shrub with small leaves and which bears yellow or red flowers in bottlebrush-like spikes near the ends of the branches in summer. It is similar to Beaufortia squarrosa a smaller shrub which has red flowers.

== Description ==
Beaufortia aestiva is sometimes a dense, rounded shrub and others an open spreading one. It occasionally grows to a height of 4 m (10 ft) but more usually 2 m (7 ft) and 2 m (7 ft) wide. The leaves are egg-shaped with the narrower end towards the base, 4–11 mm (0.2–0.4 in) long and are arranged in alternating pairs (decussate), so that they form four rows along the stems.

The flowers are creamy orange-coloured to red and are arranged in heads 35–45 mm (1–2 in) in diameter, on the ends of branches which continue to grow after flowering. Flowering occurs from June to December, sometimes later and is followed by fruit which are woody capsules 7–9 millimetres (0.3–0.4 in) long. It can be distinguished from other beaufortias by its stamens which are in bundles of 5 to 7, 28–40 mm (1–2 in) long, joined for about half their length.

== Taxonomy and naming ==
Beaufortia aestiva was first formally described in 1998 by Kristine J. Brooks in Nuytsia from a specimen found near Binnu. The specific epithet ("aestiva") is a Latin word meaning "summer".

== Distribution and habitat ==
Beaufortia aestiva mainly occurs between Kalbarri and Eneabba in the Avon Wheatbelt, Geraldton Sandplains, Jarrah Forest and Yalgoo bioregions of south-western Western Australia. It grows in deep sand on sandplains in kwongan.

== Conservation ==
Beaufortia aestiva is classified as "not threatened" by the Western Australian Government Department of Biodiversity, Conservation and Attractions.

=== Other colour forms ===
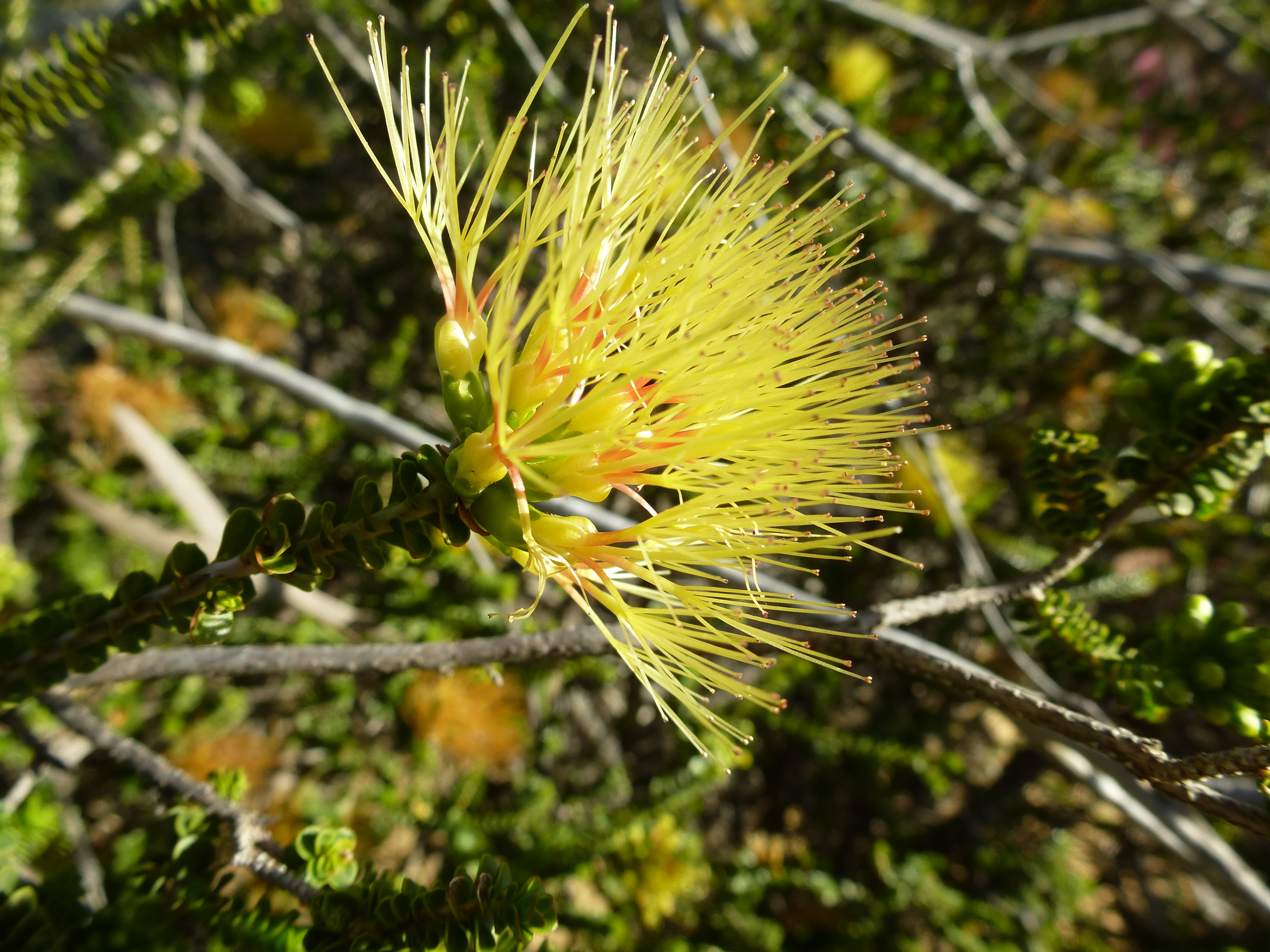
Yellow form growing in Kalbarri National Park

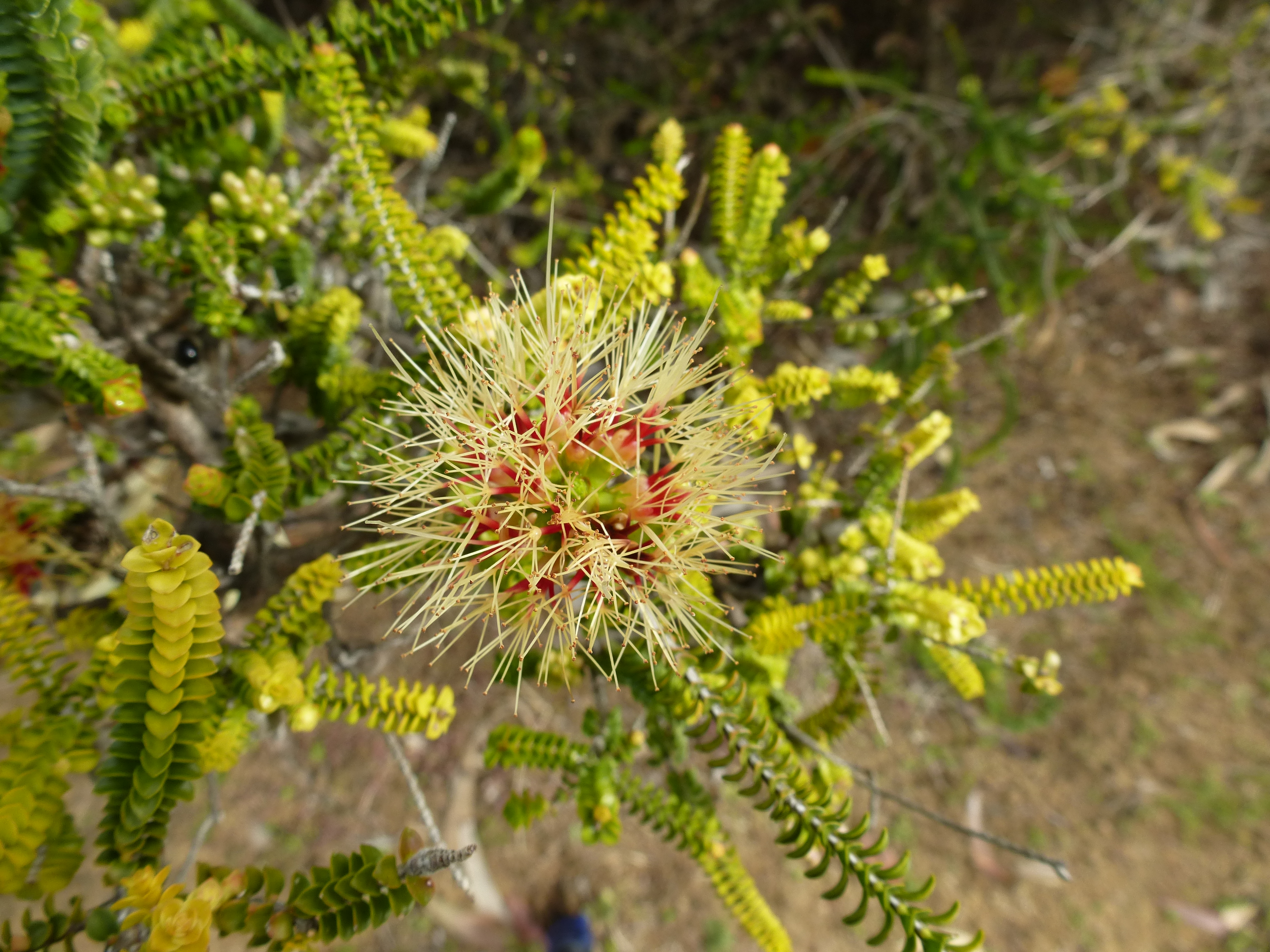
Red and yellow form in Kings Park
