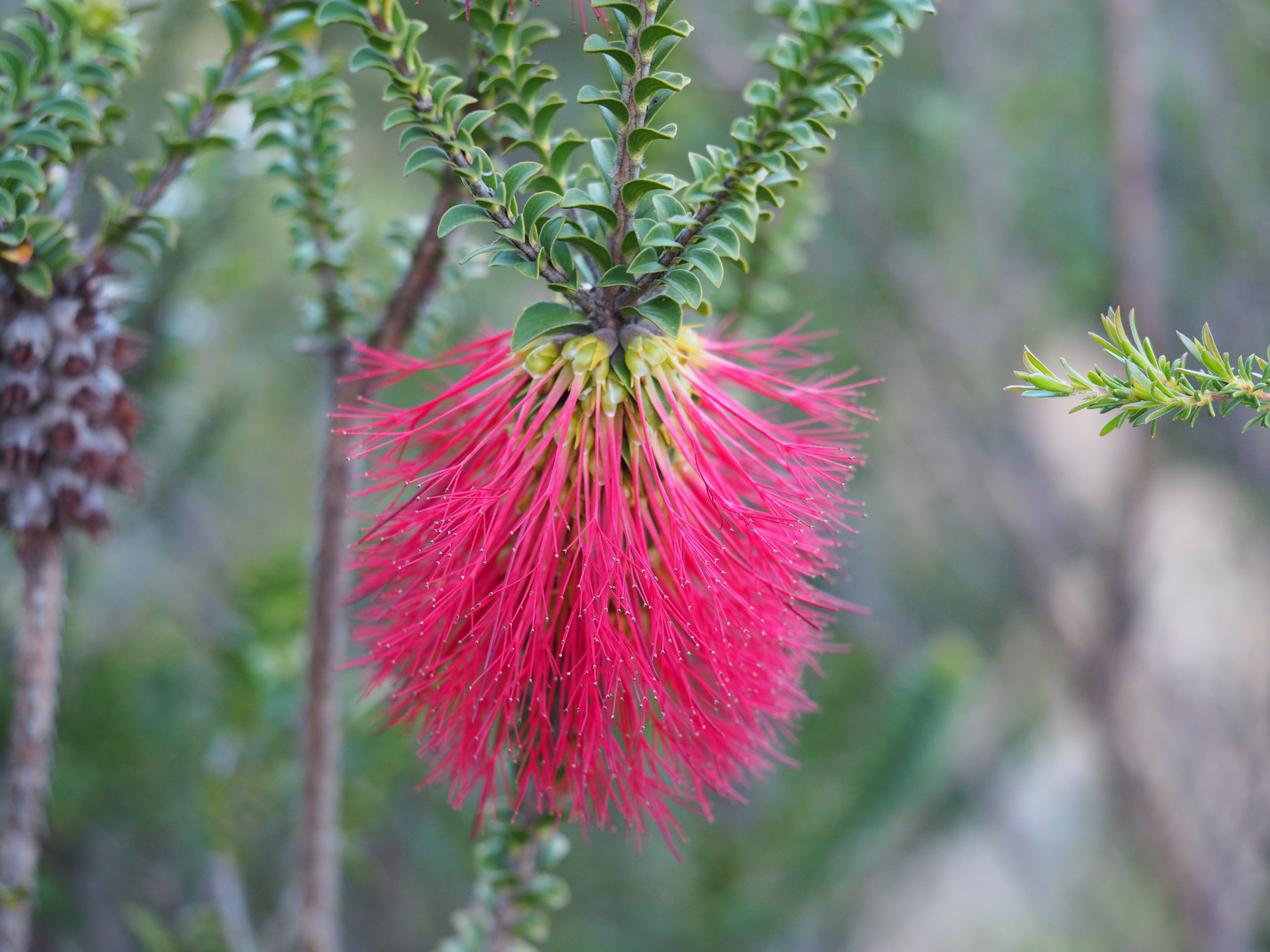
- Foliage and flowers of Beaufortia decussata

Scientific classification
- Kingdom: Plantae
- Clade: Tracheophytes
- Clade: Angiosperms
- Clade: Eudicots
- Clade: Rosids
- Order: Myrtales
- Family: Myrtaceae
- Genus: Beaufortia
- Species: B. decussata

Binomial name
- Beaufortia decussata R.Br.

= Beaufortia decussata =

Gravel bottlebrush

Species of flowering plant

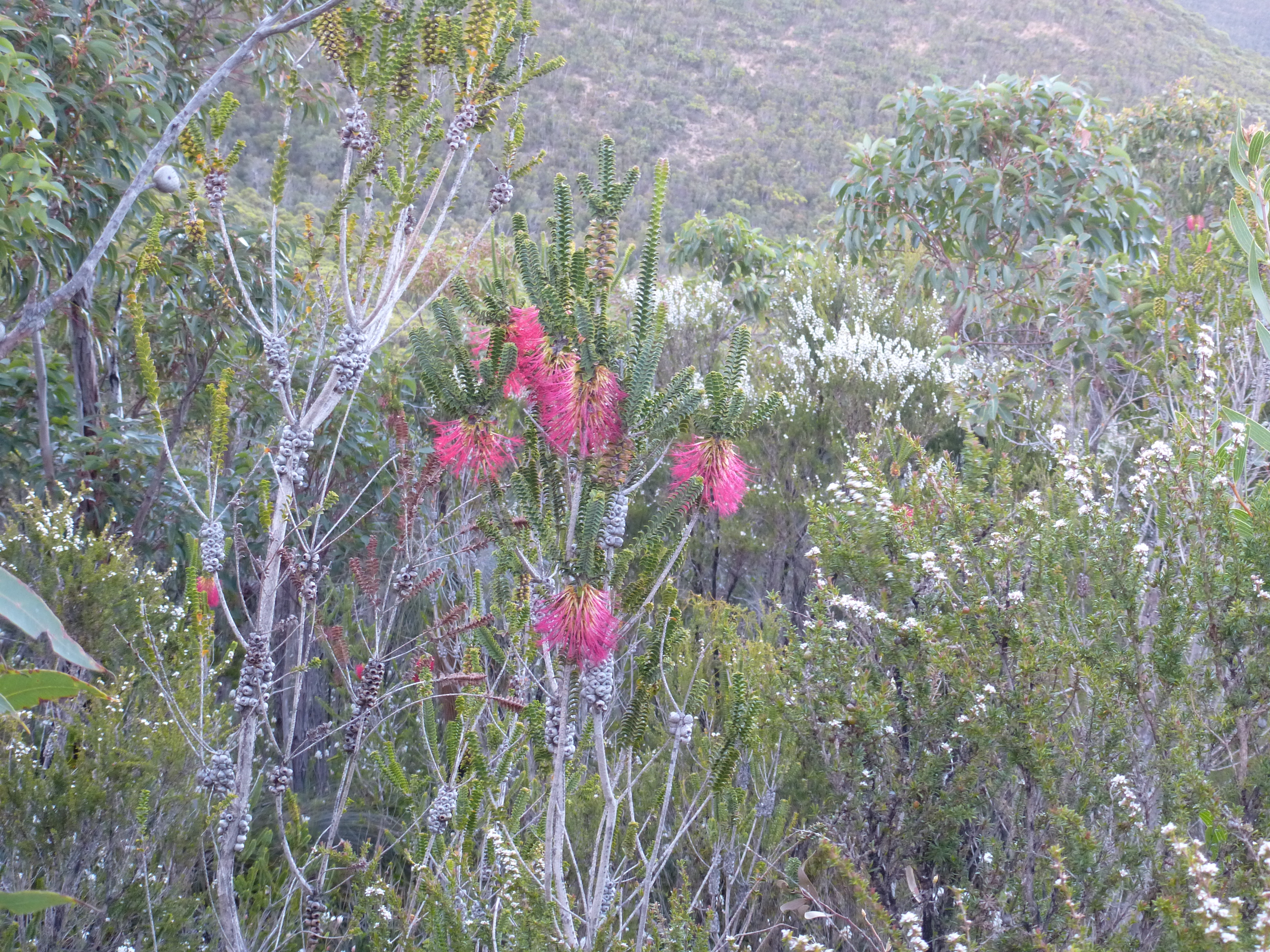
Habit near the Bluff Knoll walking track.

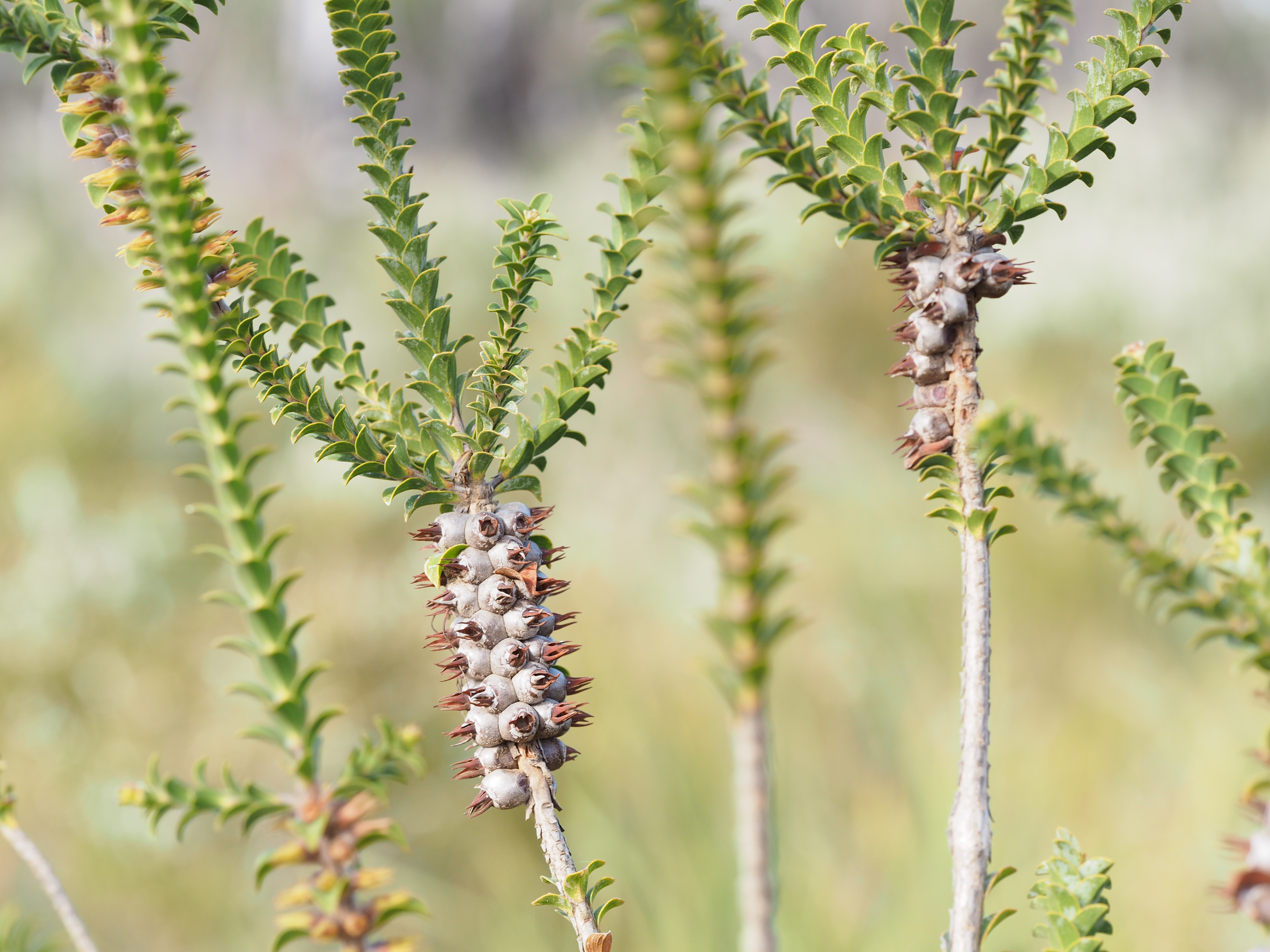
Fruit

Beaufortia decussata, commonly known as gravel bottlebrush, is a species of flowering plant in the myrtle family, Myrtaceae and is endemic to the southwest of Western Australia. It has long stems branching only near the upper ends, and scarlet to orange-red flowers in a bottlebrush shape beneath the branches.

== Description ==
Beaufortia decussata is an erect, open shrub with few branches growing to a height of 3 m (10 ft). The leaves are arranged in alternating pairs (decussate) so that they make four rows along the stems. They are egg-shaped, pointed at the end, about 10 mm (0.4 in) long and usually have 5 veins visible.

The flowers are red to orange red and are arranged in heads about 40 mm (2 in) in diameter and 100 mm (4 in) long, forming a cylinder around the long stems under their branches. There are 5 sepals, 5 small petals and 5 bundles of stamens which give the flowers their colour and are much longer than the inconspicuous petals. Flowering occurs either from August to December or from January to April and is followed by fruit which are woody capsules. It was described in John Sims's Edwards Botanical Register as "a very splendid shrub".

== Taxonomy and naming ==
Beaufortia decussata was the first species of Beaufortia to be described. It was formally described in 1812 by Robert Brown in William Townsend Aiton's Hortus Kewensis. The specific epithet is from the Latin decussatus meaning "form crosswise like the letter X, the Roman numeral ten".

== Distribution and habitat ==
Beaufortia decussata occurs in the Esperance Plains, Jarrah Forest and Warren bioregions in the southwest of Western Australia, where it grows in tall shrubland in soils derived from laterite.

== Conservation ==
Beaufortia decussata is classified as "not threatened" by the Western Australian Government Department of Biodiversity, Conservation and Attractions.
