= Beaufortia eriocephala =

Conservation status
- Priority Three — Poorly Known Taxa (DEC)

Scientific classification
- Kingdom: Plantae
- Clade: Tracheophytes
- Clade: Angiosperms
- Clade: Eudicots
- Clade: Rosids
- Order: Myrtales
- Family: Myrtaceae
- Genus: Beaufortia
- Species: B. eriocephala

Binomial name
- Beaufortia eriocephala W.Fitzg.

Synonyms
- Melaleuca lachnocephala Craven & R.D.Edwards

Species of flowering plant

Beaufortia eriocephala, commonly known as woolly bottlebrush or woolly beaufortia, is a species of flowering plant in the myrtle family, Myrtaceae and is endemic to the southwest of Western Australia. It differs from other beaufortias in having woolly red flowers and hairy younger leaves, with mature leaves that are less than 1 mm (0.04 in) wide.

== Description ==
Beaufortia eriocephala is a compact shrub which grows to a height of 0.5 m (2 ft) and 0.4 m (1 ft) wide. The leaves are arranged in opposite pairs and are linear to narrowly lance-shaped, 5–10 mm (0.2–0.4 in) long and 0.4–0.7 mm (0.02–0.03 in) long. The leaves are hairy but become glabrous with age.

The flowers are arranged in almost spherical heads on the ends of branches which continue to grow after flowering. The flowers have 5 sepals, 5 petals and 5 bundles of stamens. The stamen bundles contain 3 to 5 stamens each, with the joined part deep red, hairy and 2.5–3.5 mm (0.098–0.14 in) long. The free part of the stamens is red to purple and a further 3–4.5 mm (0.1–0.2 in) long. Flowering occurs from October to December and is followed by fruits which are woody capsules 8.5–10 mm (0.3–0.4 in) long.

== Taxonomy and naming ==
Melaleuca eriocephala was first formally described in 1905 by the Australian botanist, William Vincent Fitzgerald in Journal of the West Australian Natural History Society. The specific epithet ("eriocephala") is from the Ancient Greek ἔριον (érion) meaning "wool" and κεφαλή (kephalḗ) meaning "head".

== Distribution and habitat ==
Beaufortia eriocephala occurs in the Avon Wheatbelt, Geraldton Sandplains, Jarrah Forest and Swan Coastal Plain bioregions in the south-west of Western Australia. It grows on slopes in sandy soils derived from laterite.

== Conservation ==
Beaufortia eriocephala is classified as "Priority Three" by the Western Australian Government Department of Biodiversity, Conservation and Attractions, meaning that it is poorly known and known from only a few locations but is not under imminent threat.
