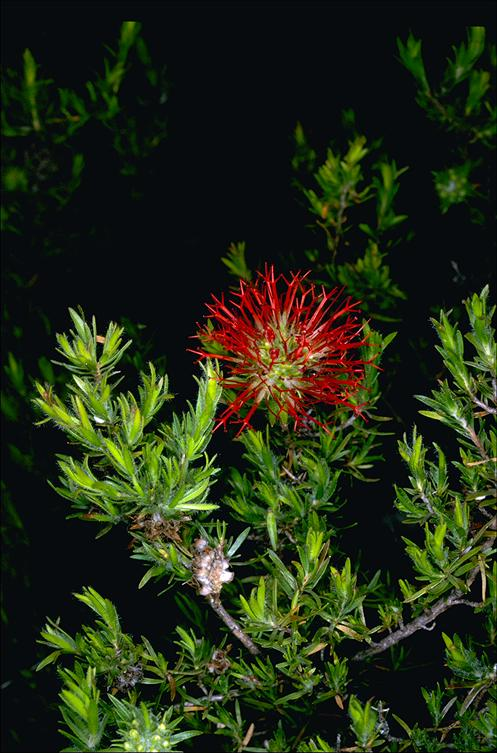

Scientific classification
- Kingdom: Plantae
- Clade: Tracheophytes
- Clade: Angiosperms
- Clade: Eudicots
- Clade: Rosids
- Order: Myrtales
- Family: Myrtaceae
- Genus: Beaufortia
- Species: B. macrostemon

Binomial name
- Beaufortia macrostemon Lindl.

Synonyms
- Beaufortia macrostemon Lindl. var. macrostemon; Melaleuca macrostemon (Lindl.) Craven & R.D.Edwards; Schizopleura macrostemon (Lindl.) Walp.

= Beaufortia macrostemon =

Darling Range beaufortia

Species of flowering plant

Beaufortia macrostemon, commonly known as Darling Range beaufortia, is a species of plant in the myrtle family, Myrtaceae and is endemic to the southwest of Western Australia. It grows as a low shrub with multiple stems, hairy young leaves and three stamens in each stamen bundle.

== Description ==
Beaufortia macrostemon is a shrub with multiple branches at the base, usually 0.2–0.5 m (0.7–2 ft) tall. Its leaves are arranged in opposite pairs, linear to lance-shaped, 10–12 mm (0.4–0.5 in) long, 1–2 mm (0.04–0.08 in) wide and hairy, at least when young. It is one of the few beaufortias with a lignotuber.

The flowers are mostly red and are arranged in heads on the ends of the branches. There are 5 sepals, 5 small petals and 5 bundles of stamens. The stamen bundles are pale yellow brown to red, 7–12 mm (0.3–0.5 in) long and hairy near the base. There are 3 stamens in each bundle and the free parts are bright red, 3–7 mm (0.1–0.3 in) and separate at a single point. Flowering occurs from September to January and is followed by fruit which are woody capsules, 10 mm (0.4 in) long and wide, joined in bundles.

== Taxonomy and naming ==
Beaufortia macrostemon was first formally described in 1839 by the English botanist John Lindley in A Sketch of the Vegetation of the Swan River Colony. The specific epithet (macrostemon) is derived from the Ancient Greek makros meaning "large" or "long" and stemon meaning "thread" or "filament".

== Distribution and habitat ==
Darling Range beaufortia usually grows in gravelly soil derived from laterite and is most common on and near the Darling Scarp in the Jarrah Forest and Swan Coastal Plain bioregions of south-western Western Australia.

== Conservation ==
Beaufortia macrostemon is classified as "not threatened" by the Western Australian Government Department of Biodiversity, Conservation and Attractions.
