= Beaufortia burbidgeae =

Conservation status
- Priority Three — Poorly Known Taxa (DEC)

Scientific classification
- Kingdom: Plantae
- Clade: Tracheophytes
- Clade: Angiosperms
- Clade: Eudicots
- Clade: Rosids
- Order: Myrtales
- Family: Myrtaceae
- Genus: Beaufortia
- Species: B. burbidgeae

Binomial name
- Beaufortia burbidgeae A.A.Burb

Species of flowering plant

Beaufortia burbidgeae, commonly known as column beaufortia, is a plant in the myrtle family, Myrtaceae and is endemic to Southwest Australia. It is a shrub with crowded, needle-shaped leaves and mostly red, or red and green flowers on the ends of the branches from spring to early summer.

== Description ==
Beaufortia burbidgeae is a shrub which sometimes grows to a height of 2 m (7 ft) or is a spreading shrub 2 m (7 ft) across. The leaves are needle-like, 6–10 mm (0.2–0.4 in) long and crowded on the woody stems.

The flowers are arranged in heads on the ends of the branches and on short side branches. The flowers have 5 sepals, 5 petals and 5 bundles of stamens. The stamen bundles are deep red at their bases and pale green or pink on the ends, 5–18 mm (0.2–0.7 in) and hairy on the inner surface. There are 3 to 5 stamens in each bundle and the free ends of the stamens are a further 2.5–6 mm (0.1–0.2 in) long. Flowering occurs from August to May but mostly in spring and early summer and is followed by fruit which are woody capsules, 3–10 mm (0.1–0.4 in) long and 7–12 mm (0.3–0.5 in) wide and sometimes clustered.

== Taxonomy and naming ==
Beaufortia burbidgeae was first formally described in 2016 by Andrew A. Burbidge and the description was published in Nuytsia. The specific epithet ("burbidgeae") honours Nancy Tyson Burbidge, the aunt of the author.

== Distribution and habitat ==
Column beaufortia grows in or near laterite on hills in heath and woodland, occasionally in sand. It occurs between Brookton, Corrigin and Boolanelling Nature Reserve in the Avon Wheatbelt bioregion in south-western Western Australia.

== Conservation ==
Beaufortia burbidgeae is classified as "Priority Three" by the Western Australian Government Department of Biodiversity, Conservation and Attractions, meaning that it is poorly known and known from only a few locations but is not under imminent threat.
