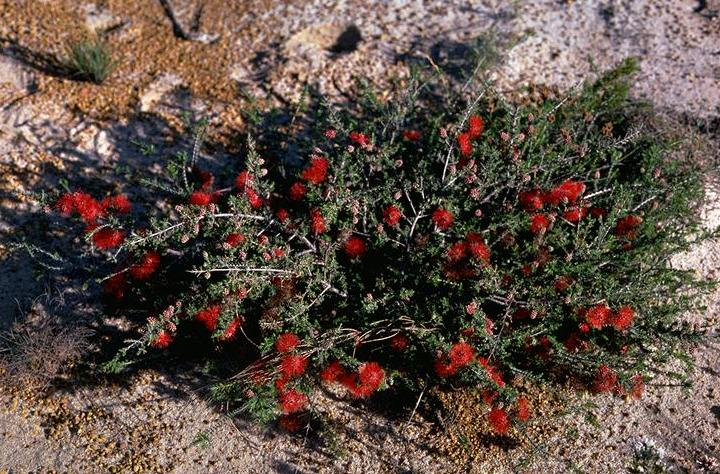

Scientific classification
- Kingdom: Plantae
- Clade: Tracheophytes
- Clade: Angiosperms
- Clade: Eudicots
- Clade: Rosids
- Order: Myrtales
- Family: Myrtaceae
- Genus: Beaufortia
- Species: B. bracteosa

Binomial name
- Beaufortia bracteosa Diels

= Beaufortia bracteosa =

Species of flowering plant

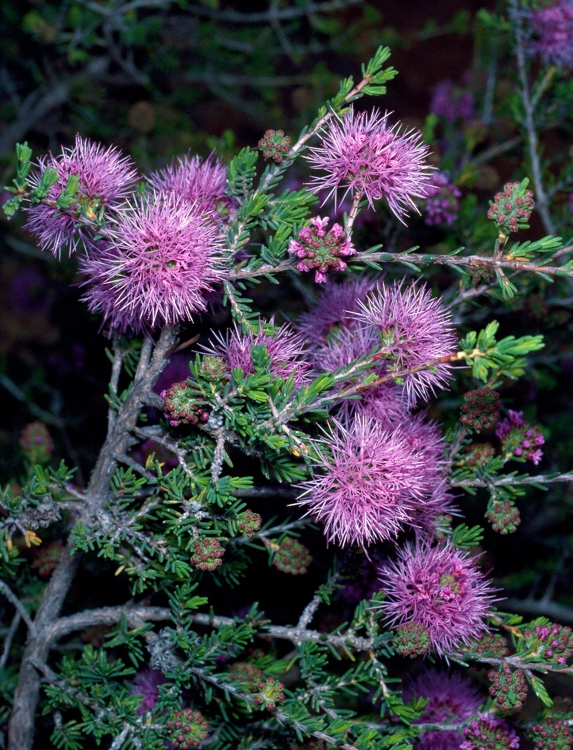
Pink form

Beaufortia bracteosa is a plant in the myrtle family, Myrtaceae and is endemic to the southwest of Western Australia. It is a shrub growing to a height of about 1 m (3 ft) with red to maroon flowers and woody fruit.

== Description ==
Beaufortia bracteosa is a compact shrub growing to a height of about 0.5–1.0 m (2–3 ft) and about 0.75 m (2 ft) in diameter. The leaves are arranged in opposite pairs and are linear in shape, 2.5–4 mm (0.1–0.2 in) long, 0.5–1.5 mm (0.02–0.06 in) wide and glabrous.

The flowers are arranged in heads on the ends of the branches and have 5 sepals, 5 petals and 5 bundles of stamens. The stamens are deep pink to red or maroon and joined for about 1.5–4 mm (0.06–0.2 in) of their length into a "claw" which is hairy on one side. The 5 or 6 stamens in each claw all spread from the same point on the claw and are a further 1–4 m (3–10 ft) long. Flowering occurs throughout most of the year but especially in spring and early summer and is followed by fruit which are woody capsules 7–11.5 mm (0.3–0.5 in) long and 4.5–6 mm (0.18–0.24 in) wide.

== Taxonomy and naming ==
Beaufortia bracteosa was first formally described in 1904 by Ludwig Diels in Fragmenta Phytographiae Australiae occidentalis. The specific epithet (bracteosa) is derived from the Latin word bractea meaning "scale" and the suffix -osa meaning "having many (or large) bracts".

== Distribution and habitat ==
This beaufortia grows in sandy soils, sometimes with clay, gravel or loam often over laterite or granite. It occurs between Latham, Dumbleyung, the Wandoo National Park and Jilbadji Nature Reserve in the Avon Wheatbelt, Coolgardie, Esperance Plains, Geraldton Sandplains, Jarrah Forest, Mallee and Swan Coastal Plain bioregions of south-western Western Australia. It is an important component of kwongan vegetation.

== Conservation ==
Beaufortia bracteosa is classified as "not threatened" by the Western Australian Government Department of Biodiversity, Conservation and Attractions.
