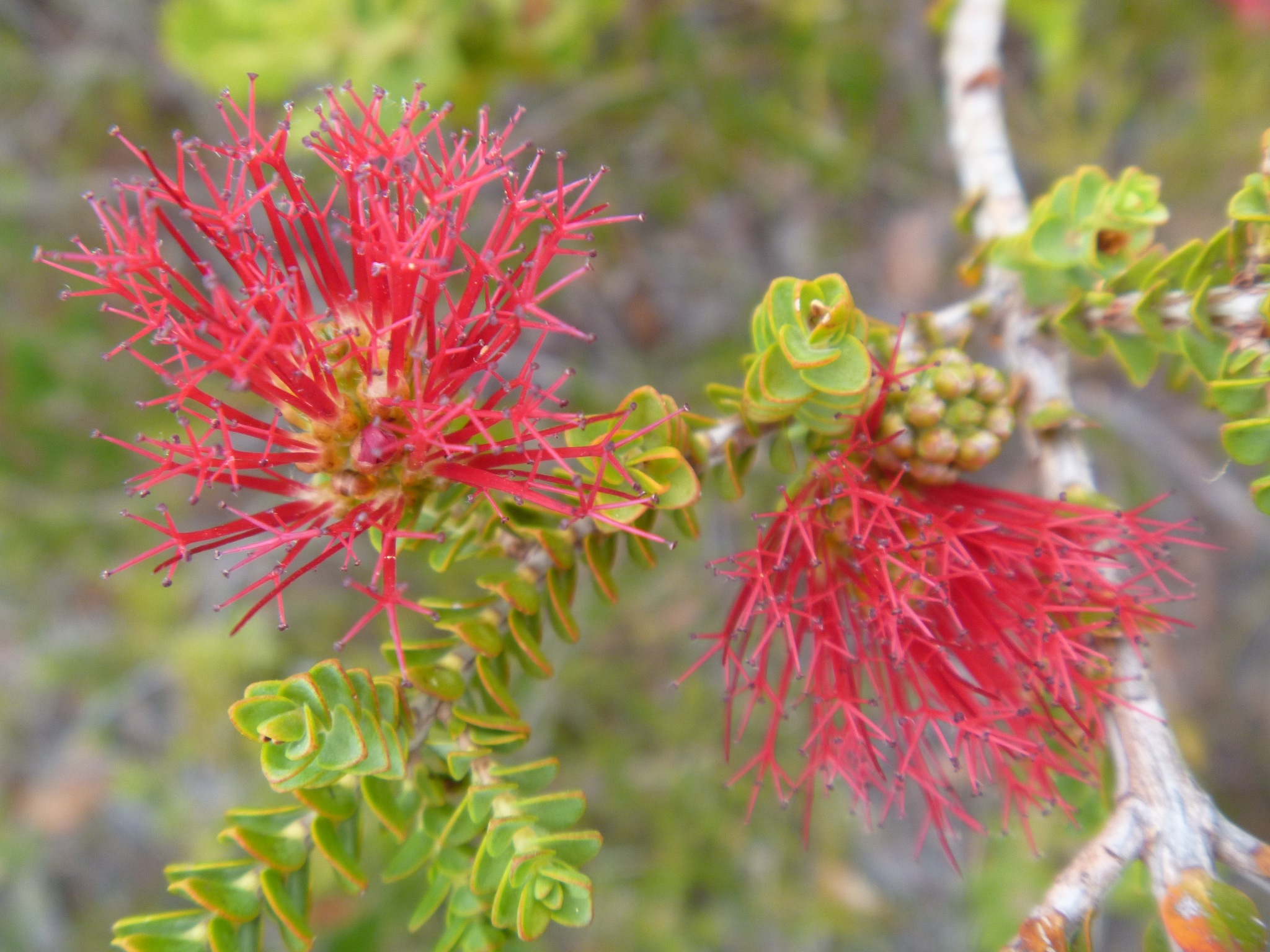
- Beaufortia anisandra in the Fitzgerald River National Park

Scientific classification
- Kingdom: Plantae
- Clade: Tracheophytes
- Clade: Angiosperms
- Clade: Eudicots
- Clade: Rosids
- Order: Myrtales
- Family: Myrtaceae
- Genus: Beaufortia
- Species: B. anisandra

Binomial name
- Beaufortia anisandra Schauer

Synonyms
- Melaleuca anisandra (Schauer) Craven & R.D.Edwards

= Beaufortia anisandra =

Dark beaufortia

Species of flowering plant

Beaufortia anisandra, commonly known as dark beaufortia, is a plant in the myrtle family Myrtaceae, and is endemic to the southwest of Western Australia. It is a densely branched shrub with egg-shaped, upward pointing leaves and which bears heads of dark bluish-purple to red flowers with stamen bundles of different lengths. It is reported to have an unpleasant odour.

== Description ==
Beaufortia anisandra is a densely branched shrub which grows to a height of 1.5 m (5 ft). The leaves are arranged in opposite pairs and are egg-shaped to lance-shaped, 3–6.5 mm (0.1–0.3 in) long, rigid, concave in cross section with a midvein and several faint lateral veins.

The flowers are red to dark purplish red and are arranged in roughly spherical heads on the ends of branches that continue to grow after flowering. The flowers have 5 sepals, 5 petals and 5 bundles of stamens. The stamens are joined for most of their length, with about 3 separate filaments extending beyond the joined part. Some bundles are more than 19 mm (0.7 in) long while others in the same flower are much shorter. The variation is stamen length in the individual flowers is a distinguishing feature of this beaufortia. Flowering occurs from January to July or from October to December and is followed by fruit which are woody capsules, 8–15 mm (0.3–0.6 in) long, 7–12 mm (0.3–0.5 in) wide and more or less clustered.

Its occurrence at Cape Riche was noted in 1854 by William Henry Harvey ("Dr. Harvey") who wrote: "It always reminds me of Sir Francis B., because I remember your telling me that he likes a plant to have a bad smell rather than none at all; and this namesake of his would surely please him, for it has an awful stench."

== Taxonomy and naming ==
Beaufortia anisandra was first formally described in 1843 by Johannes Conrad Schauer in Dissertatio phytographica de Regelia, Beaufortia et Calothamno. The specific epithet (anisandra) means "unequal male", referring to the length of the stamens.

== Distribution and habitat ==
Beaufortia anisandra mainly occurs near Albany and Esperance in the Avon Wheatbelt, Esperance Plains and Jarrah Forest bioregions of south-western Western Australia. It grows in sand and rocky quartzite soils on hills, rocky outcrops and plains.

== Conservation ==
Beaufortia anisandra is classified as "not threatened" by the Western Australian Government Department of Biodiversity, Conservation and Attractions.
