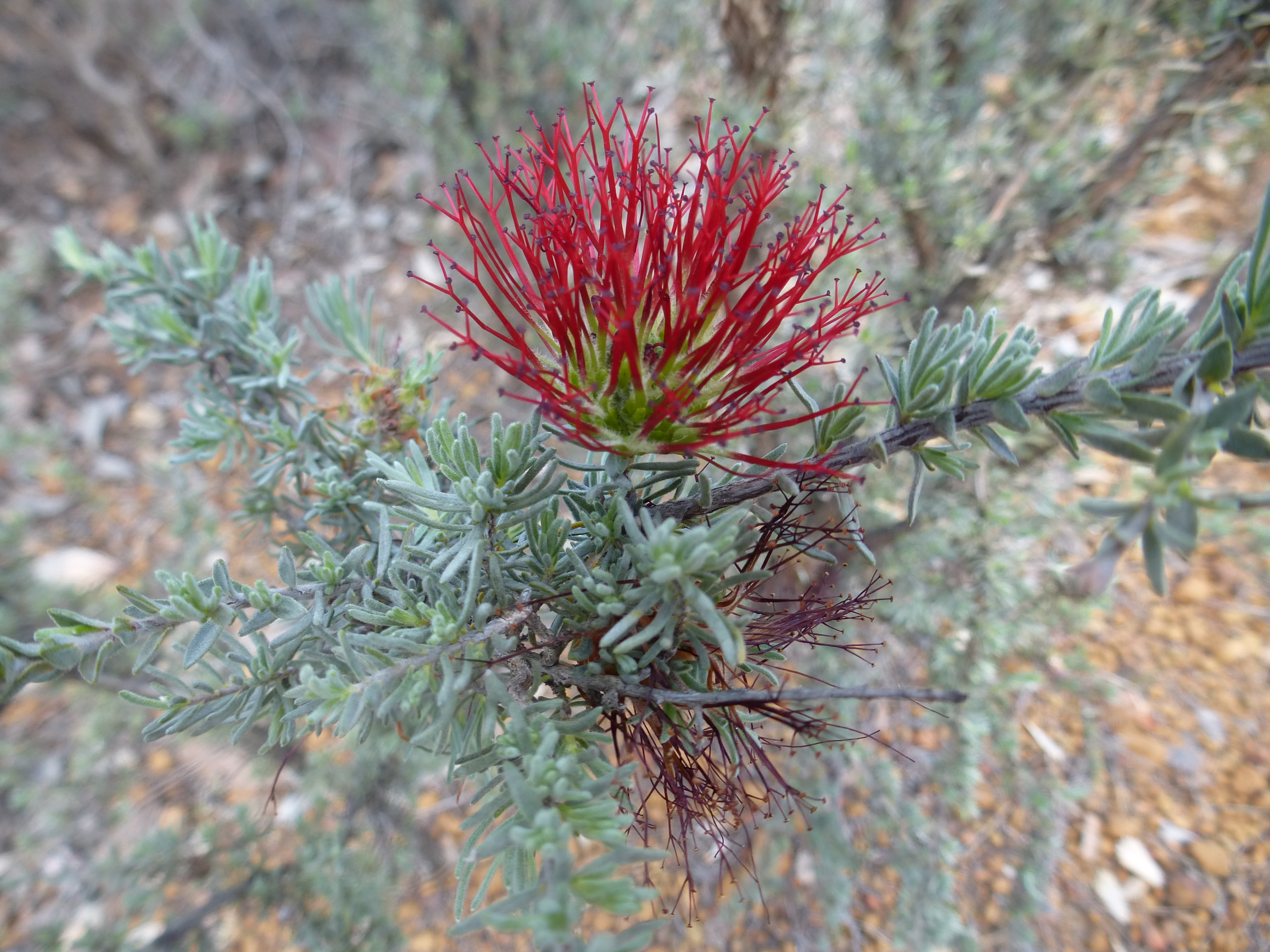
- In Wingedine Nature Reserve near Kojonup

Scientific classification
- Kingdom: Plantae
- Clade: Tracheophytes
- Clade: Angiosperms
- Clade: Eudicots
- Clade: Rosids
- Order: Myrtales
- Family: Myrtaceae
- Genus: Beaufortia
- Species: B. incana

Binomial name
- Beaufortia incana (Benth.) A.S.George

Synonyms
- Beaufortia macrostemon var. incana Benth.; Melaleuca cinerea Craven & R.D.Edwards

= Beaufortia incana =

Grey-leaved beaufortia

Species of flowering plant

Beaufortia incana, commonly known as grey-leaved beaufortia, is a plant in the myrtle family Myrtaceae, and is endemic to southwest of Western Australia. It is a shrub with crowded leaves that appear whitish due to their covering of fine, soft hairs on both surfaces. It has almost spherical heads of red flowers in spring.

== Description ==
Beaufortia incana is a shrub that typically grows to a height of 0.5–2 m (1 ft 8 in – 6 ft 7 in). The leaves are arranged alternately, crowded on the younger stems, linear to lance-shaped and arranged in alternate pairs (decussate) so that they make four rows along the stems. The leaves are 5–12 mm (0.20–0.47 in) long and have a covering of fine hairs on both surfaces.

The flowers are red, arranged in dense heads about 25 mm (0.98 in) in diameter on the ends of the branches and are surrounded by long soft hairs. The flowers have 5 sepals, 5 petals and 5 bundles of stamens. The stamens give the flowers their colour and are in bundles of 3, joined for most of their length, the bundles of different lengths. Flowering occurs from August to December and is followed by fruit that are woody capsules.

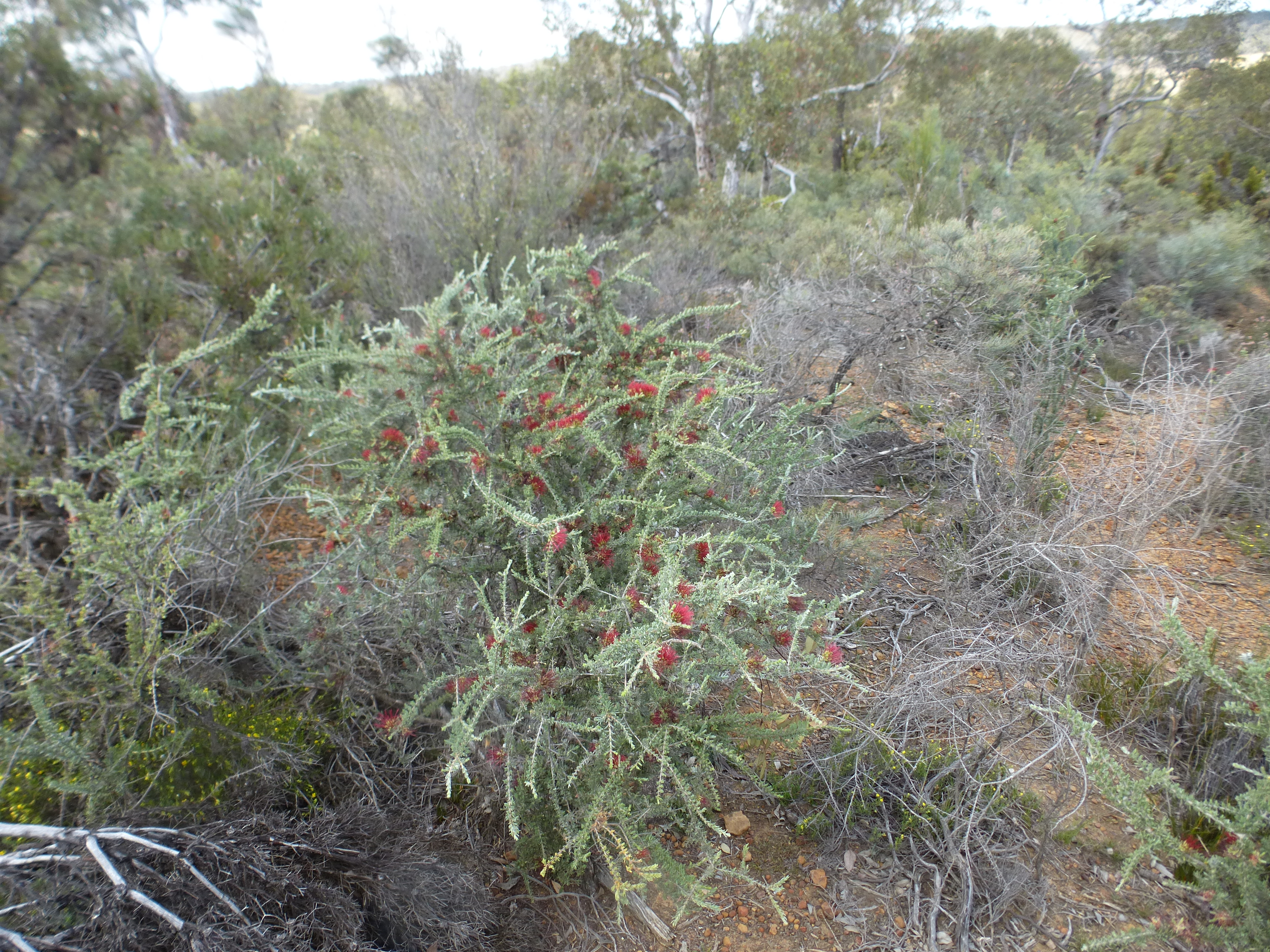
Habit

== Taxonomy and naming ==
Beaufortia macrostemon var. incana was first formally described in 1867 by George Bentham in Flora Australiensis. In 1972, Alex George raised it to species status in Nuytsia. The specific epithet ("incana") is a Latin word meaning "quite gray".

== Distribution and habitat ==
Beaufortia incana grows in kwongan and shrubland in the Avon Wheatbelt, Jarrah Forest, Mallee and Swan Coastal Plain biogeographic regions of south-western Western Australia. It grows in soils derived from laterite on hills and sandplains.

== Conservation ==
Beaufortia incana is classified as "not threatened" by the Western Australian Government Department of Parks and Wildlife.
