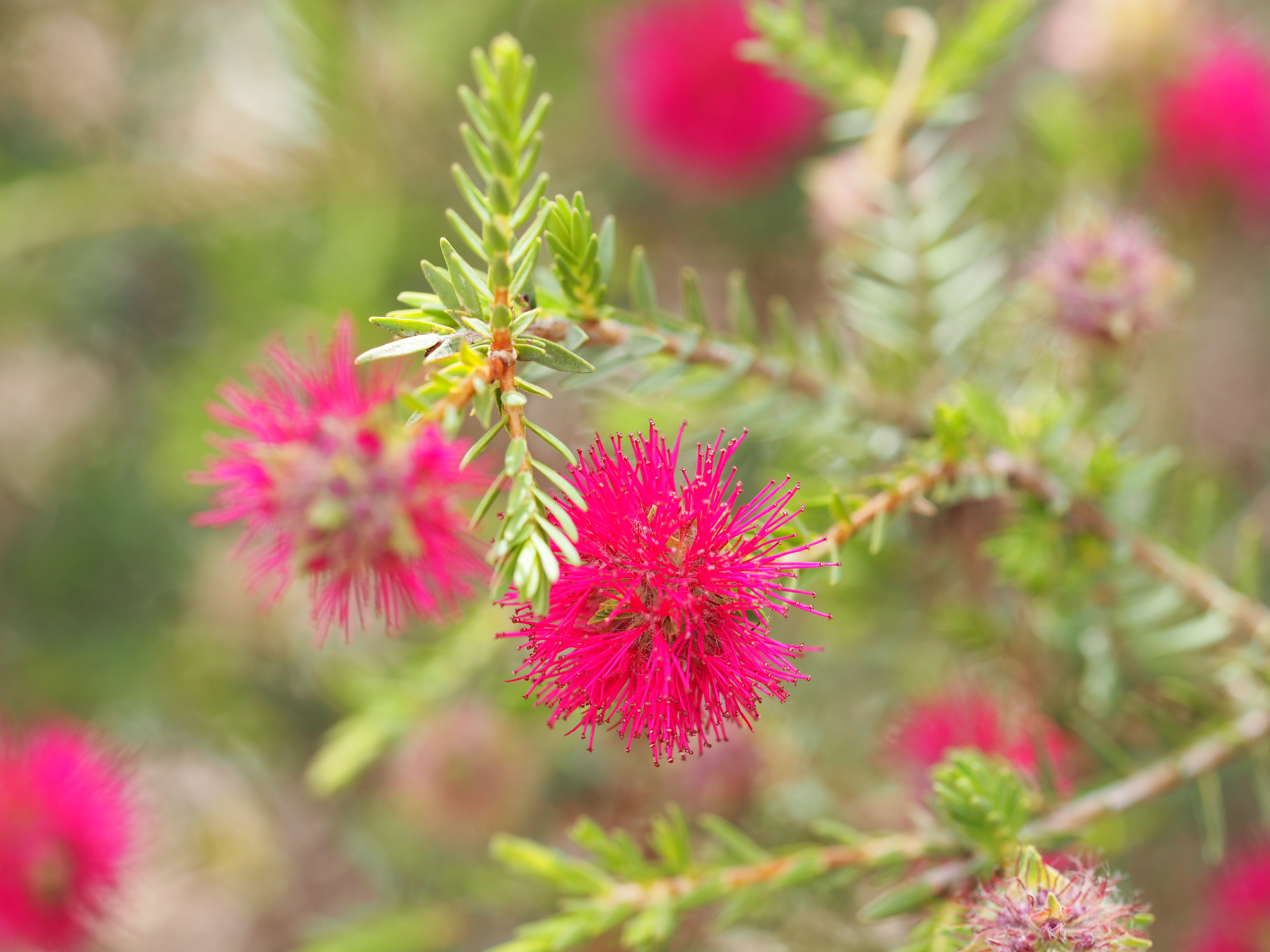

Conservation status
- Priority Three — Poorly Known Taxa (DEC)

Scientific classification
- Kingdom: Plantae
- Clade: Tracheophytes
- Clade: Angiosperms
- Clade: Eudicots
- Clade: Rosids
- Order: Myrtales
- Family: Myrtaceae
- Genus: Beaufortia
- Species: B. purpurea

Binomial name
- Beaufortia purpurea Lindl.

Synonyms
- Manglesia purpurea Lindl. nom. inval., nom. nud.; Melaleuca purpurea (Lindl.) Craven & R.D.Edwards; Schizopleura purpurea (Lindl.) Walp.

= Beaufortia purpurea =

Purple beaufortia

Species of flowering plant

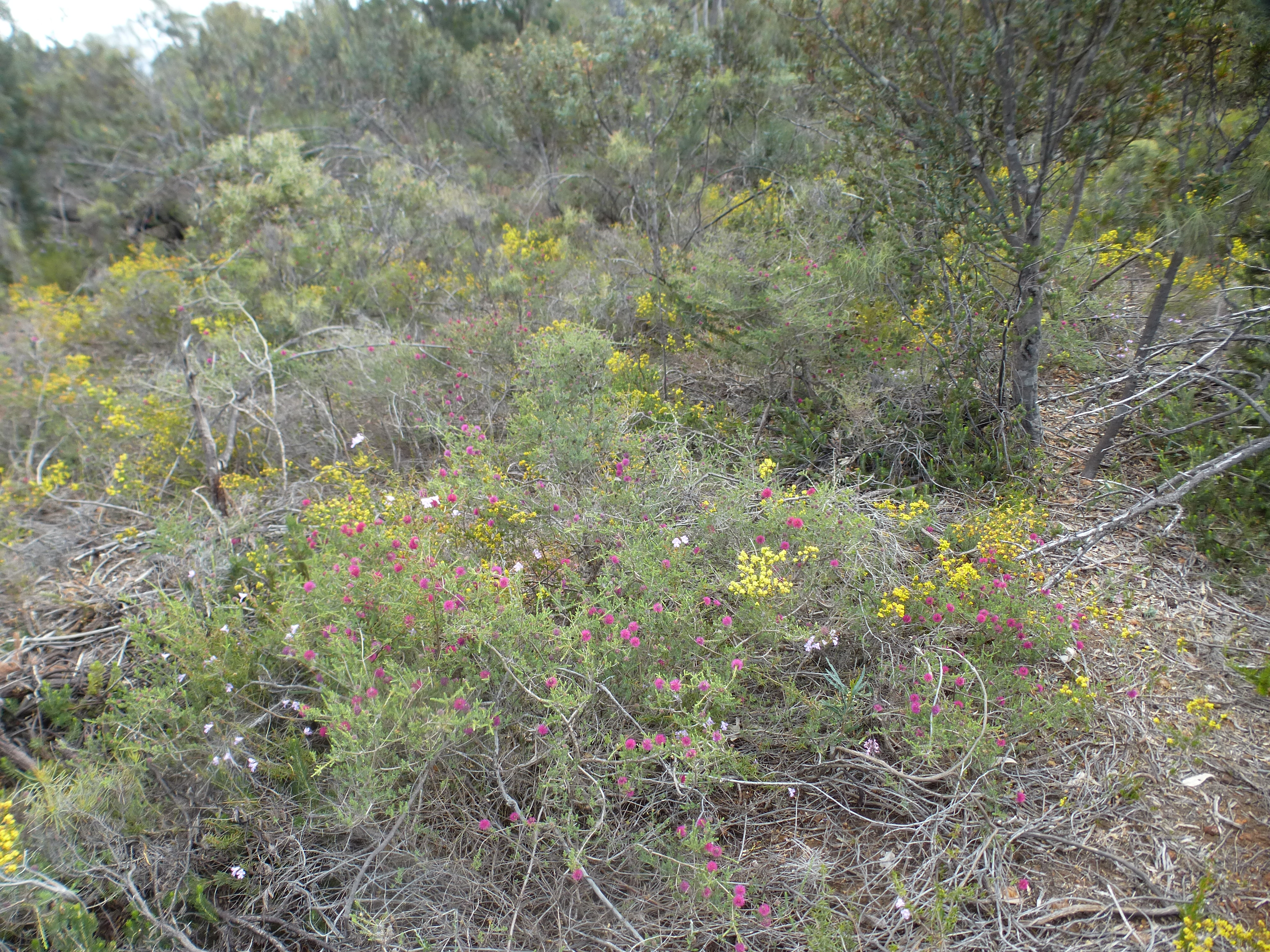
Habit in the Morangup Nature Reserve near Toodyay

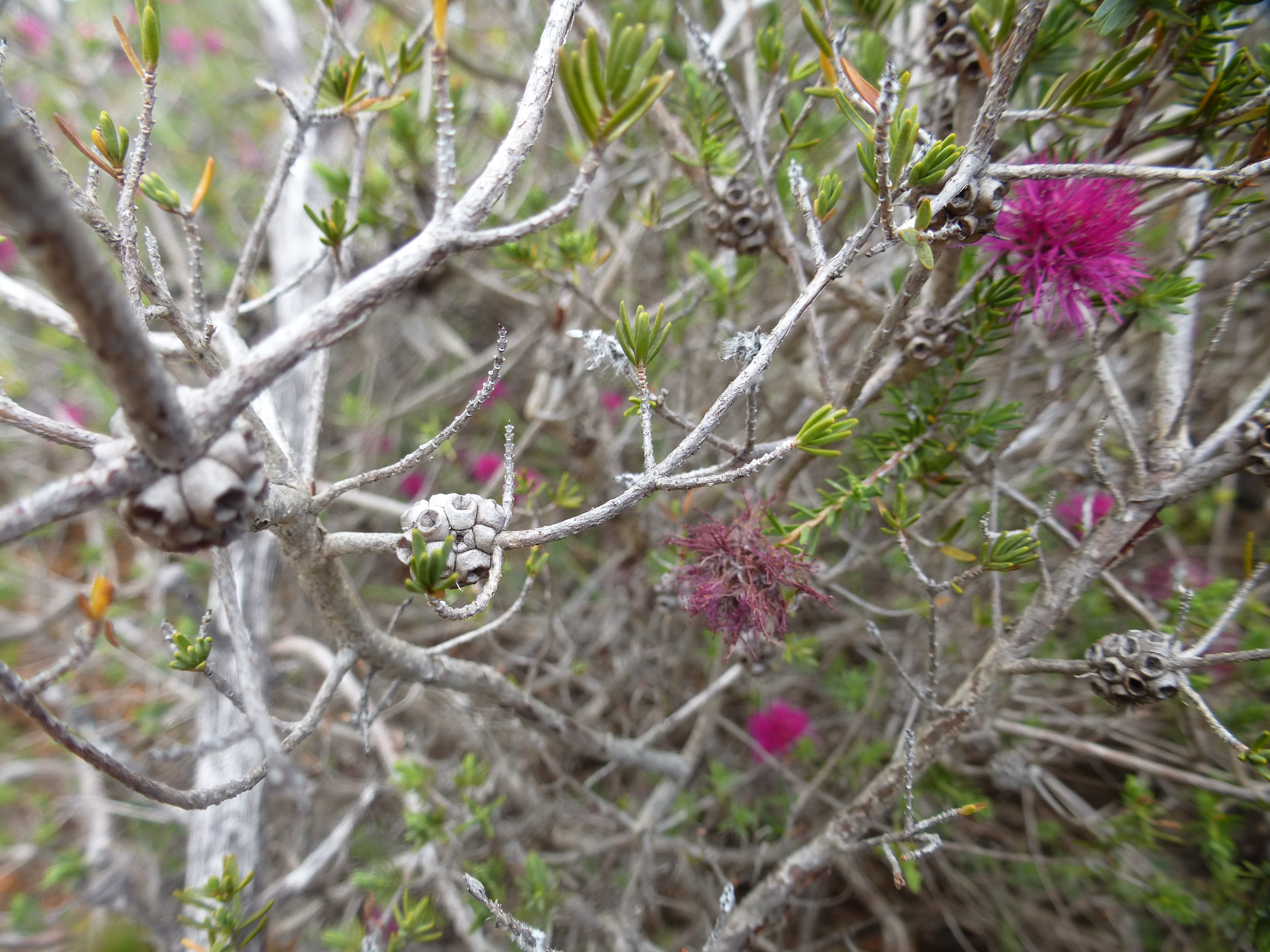
Fruit

Beaufortia purpurea, commonly known as purple beaufortia, is a species of flowering plant in the myrtle family, Myrtaceae and is endemic to the southwest of Western Australia. It is an erect or spreading shrub with linear to egg-shaped leaves and purplish-red flowers in dense heads on the ends of branches which continue to grow after flowering.

== Description ==
Beaufortia purpurea is an erect, sometimes open, spreading shrub with long, straight, thin branches and which grows to a height of about 1.5 m (5 ft). The leaves are arranged in alternate pairs (decussate) on the younger branches, so that they make four rows along the stems. The leaves are lance-shaped to egg-shaped while the oldest ones are linear. The leaves are 4–8.5 mm (0.16–0.33 in) long and have 3 or 5 veins.

The flowers are purple or purplish red and are arranged in bottlebrush-like spikes on the ends of branches which continue to grow after flowering. The flowering part of the stem is densely hairy and the flowers have 5 sepals, 5 petals and 5 bundles of stamens. The stamen bundles, which give the flowers their colour contain 3 to 7 (usually 5) stamens which are joined for about half their length. Flowering occurs from October to December or in January to February and is followed by fruit which are woody capsules in clusters about 12 mm (0.47 in) long .

== Taxonomy and naming ==
Beaufortia purpurea was first formally described in 1839 by English botanist, John Lindley in A Sketch of the Vegetation of the Swan River Colony. The specific epithet (purpurea) is a Latin word meaning "purple".

== Distribution and habitat ==
Beaufortia purpurea mainly occurs in the outer suburbs of Perth in the Jarrah Forest and Swan Coastal Plain biogeographic regions. It usually grows in soils derived from laterite or granite on rocky slopes.

== Conservation ==
Beaufortia orbifolia is classified as "Priority Three" by the Western Australian Government Department of Biodiversity, Conservation and Attractions meaning that it is poorly known and known from only a few locations but is not under imminent threat.
