= Ragged Peak =

Ragged Peak may refer to:

- Ragged Peak (Denali National Park), Alaska
- Ragged Peak (Yosemite), California

== See also ==
- Ragged Peaks, Antarctica
- Ragged Mountain (disambiguation)
