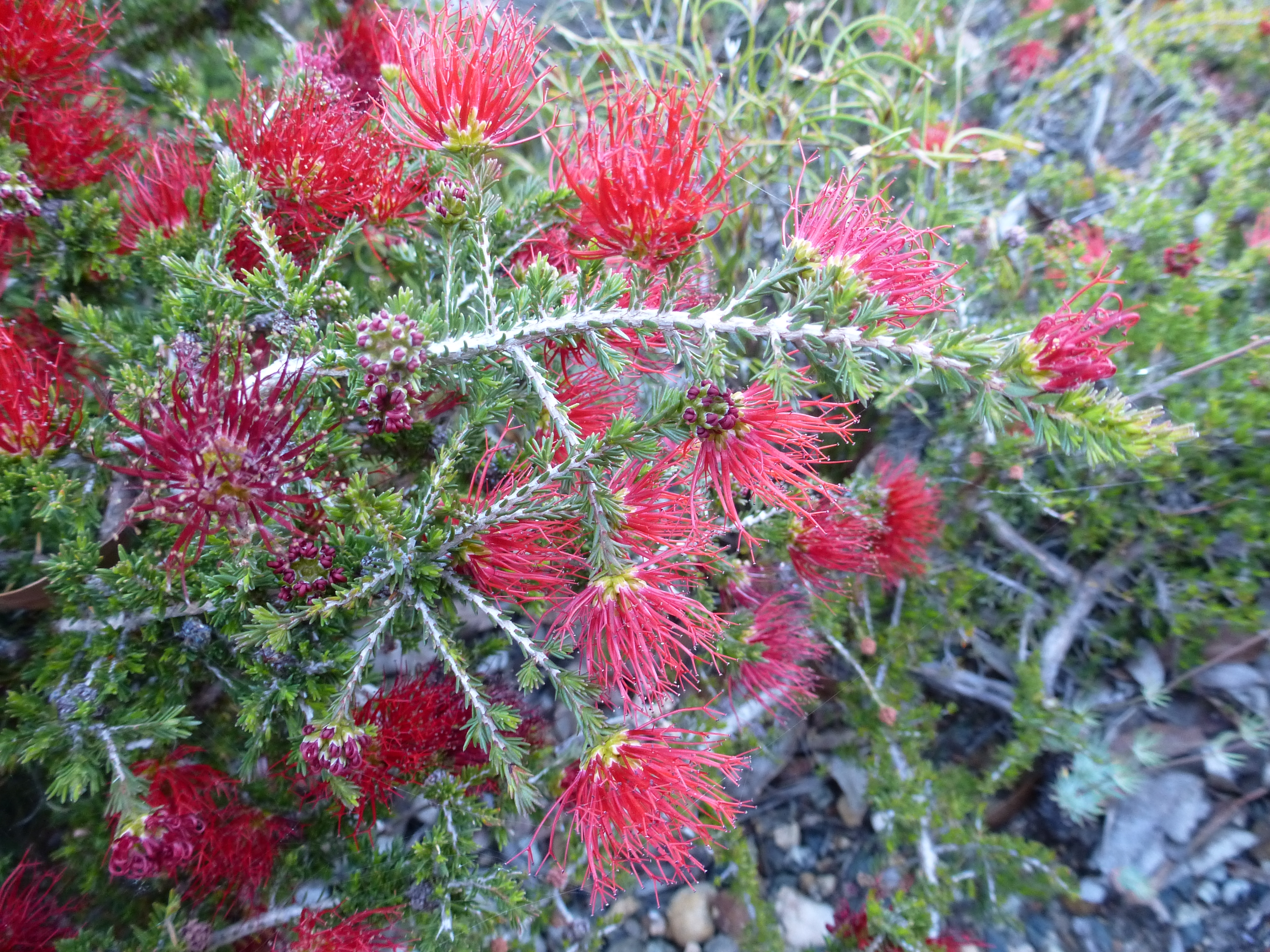
- Beaufortia cyrtodonta growing near the Bluff Knoll walking track.

Scientific classification
- Kingdom: Plantae
- Clade: Tracheophytes
- Clade: Angiosperms
- Clade: Eudicots
- Clade: Rosids
- Order: Myrtales
- Family: Myrtaceae
- Genus: Beaufortia
- Species: B. cyrtodonta

Binomial name
- Beaufortia cyrtodonta (Turcz.) Benth

Synonyms
- Beaufortia heterophylla Turcz.; Melaleuca cyrtodonta Turcz.

= Beaufortia cyrtodonta =

Stirling Range bottlebrush

Species of flowering plant

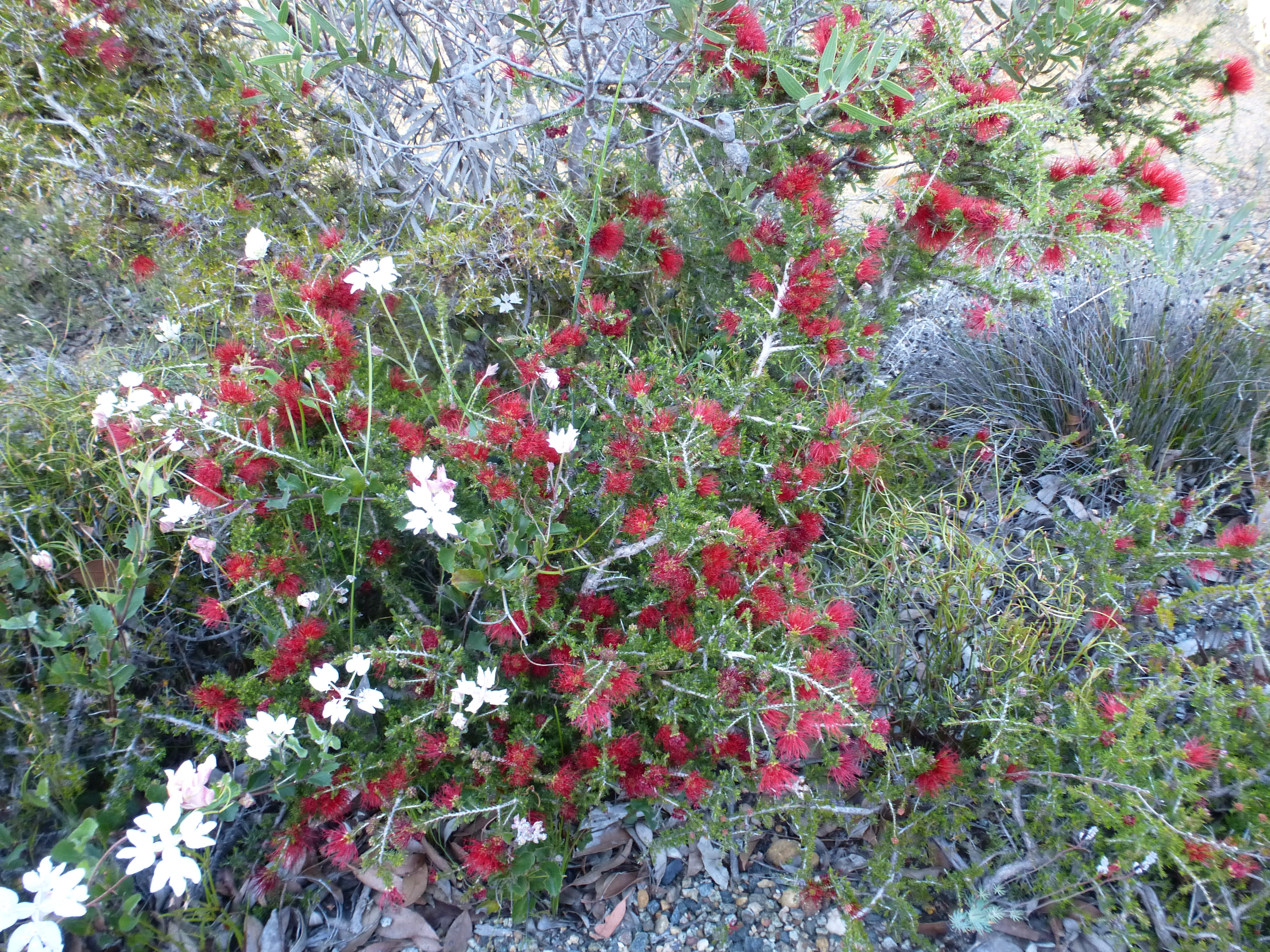
Habit

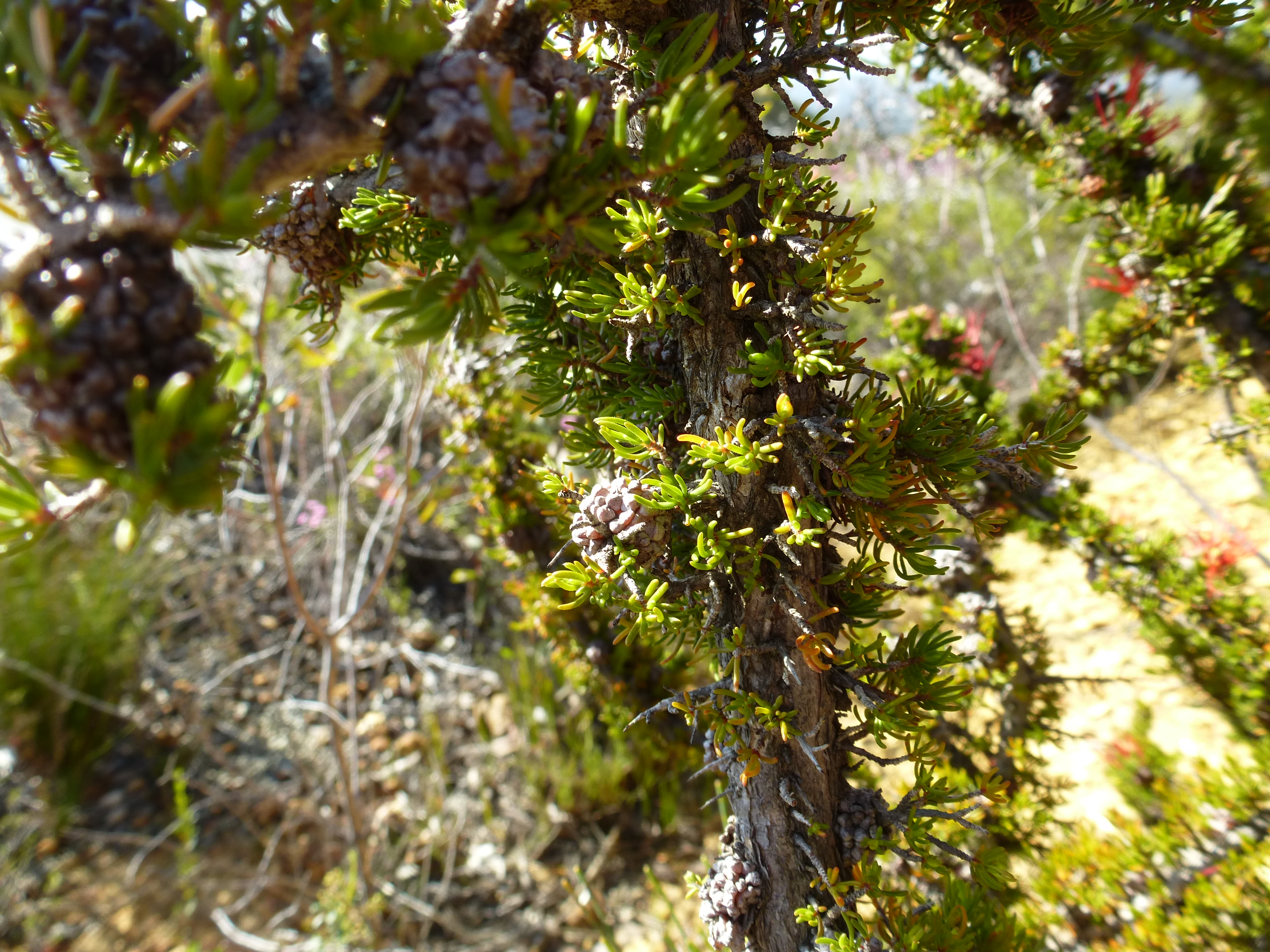
Fruits

Beaufortia cyrtodonta, commonly known as Stirling Range bottlebrush, is a plant in the myrtle family, Myrtaceae and is endemic to the southwest of Western Australia. It is a compact shrub with crowded leaves which appear greyish due to their covering of fine, soft hairs. It has heads of red flowers in spring and occurs in the Stirling Range district.

== Description ==
Beaufortia cyrtodonta is a compact shrub which grows to a height of 1.5 metres (5 ft). The leaves are linear, crowded and arranged in alternate pairs (decussate) so that they make four rows along the stems. The leaves are linear to lance-shaped, 4–7 millimetres (0.2–0.3 in) long and often have a covering of fine hairs, giving them a greyish appearance.

The flowers are red and are arranged in heads about 2.5 millimetres (0.1 in) in diameter on the ends of branches. The flowers have 5 sepals, 5 petals and 5 bundles of stamens. The bundles contain 3 stamens and are joined for 8.5–13.5 millimetres (0.3–0.5 in) with the free stamen ends a further 1.5–3 millimetres (0.06–0.1 in) long. Flowering occurs from June to November and is followed by fruits which are woody capsules 7–13 millimetres (0.3–0.5 in) long and clustered together.

== Taxonomy and naming ==
Melaleuca cyrtodonta was first formally described in 1867 by Nikolai Turczaninow in Bulletin de la Société Impériale des Naturalistes de Moscou. In 1867, George Bentham transferred it to Beaufortia as Beaufortia cyrtodonta. The specific epithet ("cyrtodonta") is from the Ancient Greek kyrtos meaning "curved" or "bent" and odous meaning "tooth".

== Distribution and habitat ==
Beaufortia cyrtodonta mainly occurs in the Stirling Range district in the Avon Wheatbelt, Esperance Plains, Jarrah Forest and Mallee bioregions of south-western Western Australia. It grows in sandy and gravelly soils often derived from laterite on hills and outcrops.

== Conservation ==
Beaufortia cyrtodonta is classified as "not threatened" by the Western Australian Government Department of Biodiversity, Conservation and Attractions.
