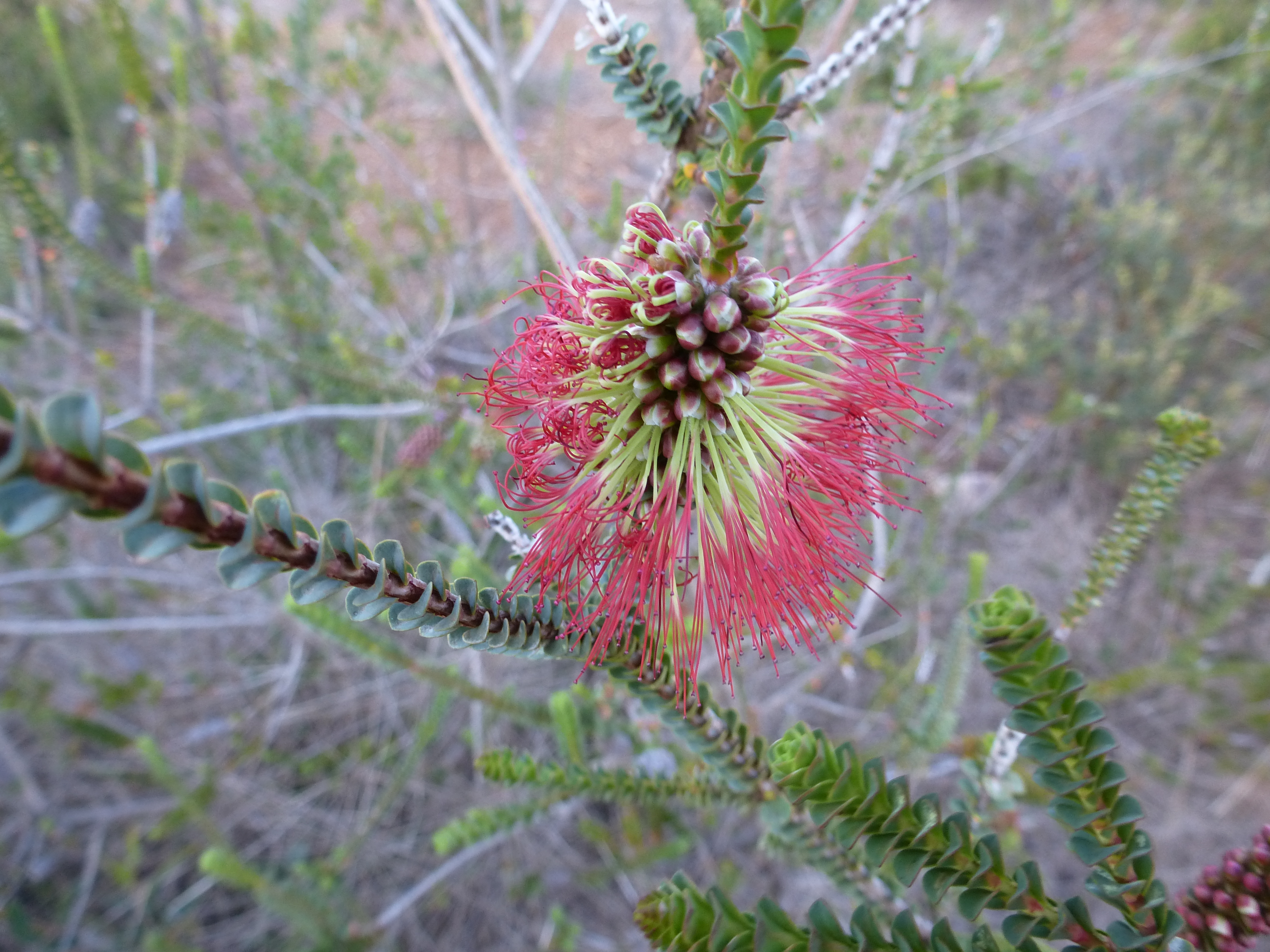
- Beaufortia orbifolia leaves and flowers

Scientific classification
- Kingdom: Plantae
- Clade: Tracheophytes
- Clade: Angiosperms
- Clade: Eudicots
- Clade: Rosids
- Order: Myrtales
- Family: Myrtaceae
- Genus: Beaufortia
- Species: B. orbifolia

Binomial name
- Beaufortia orbifolia Muell.

Synonyms
- Melaleuca orbifolia (Muell.) Craven & R.D.Edwards

= Beaufortia orbifolia =

Ravensthorpe bottlebrush

Species of flowering plant

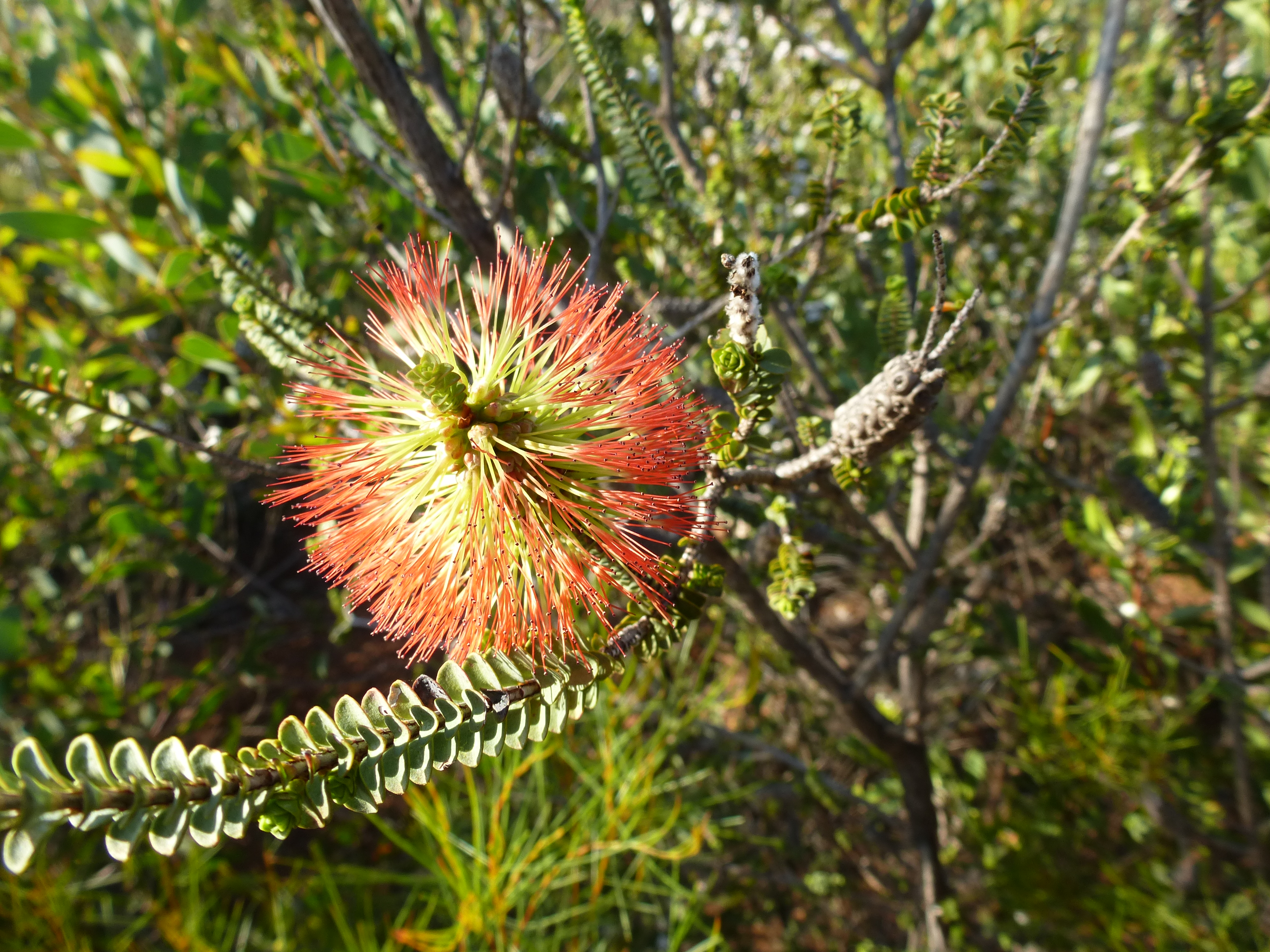
On the north side of the Ravensthorpe Range

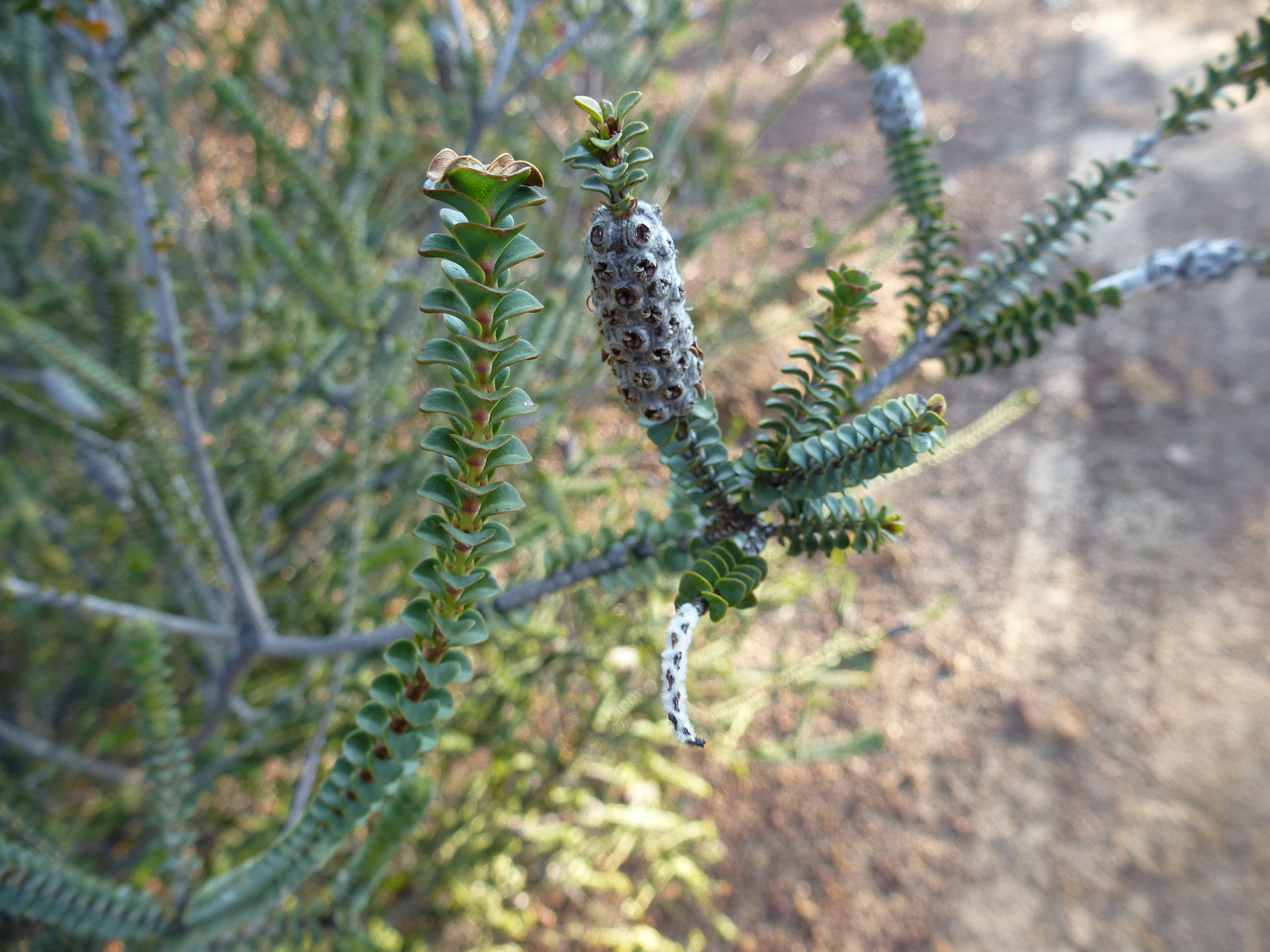
Leaves and fruits

Beaufortia orbifolia, commonly known as Ravensthorpe bottlebrush, is a species of flowering plant in the myrtle family, Myrtaceae and is endemic to the southwest of Western Australia. It is an erect or spreading shrub with round, dished leaves crowded on the younger stems, and bright red flower spikes. It is found in laterite hills near Ravensthorpe. It is distinguished from other beaufortias by having green stamen bundles with the free ends red.

== Description ==
Beaufortia orbifolia is an erect, sometimes open, spreading shrub which grows to a height of about 3 m (10 ft). The leaves are arranged in alternate pairs (decussate), so that, especially on the younger branches, they make four rows along the stems. The leaves are flat or slightly dished, broad egg-shaped to round, 4.5–6 mm (0.18–0.24 in) long and have 5 or 7 veins.

The flowers are red and green and are arranged in bottlebrush-like spikes about 40 mm (2 in) in diameter and 60 mm (2 in) long on the ends of branches which continue to grow after flowering. The flowers have 5 sepals, 5 petals and 5 bundles of stamens. The stamen bundles contain 3 to 7 stamens, are green in their lower half and red in the upper and joined for about half of their length. Flowering occurs from August to January and is followed by fruits which are woody capsules in roughly spherical or cylindrical clusters.

== Taxonomy and naming ==
Beaufortia orbifolia was first formally described in 1862 by Victorian government botanist, Ferdinand von Mueller in Fragmenta phytographiae Australiae from a specimen collected on the slopes of East Mount Barren by George Maxwell. The specific epithet (orbifolia) is derived from the Latin orbis meaning "a circle" and folium meaning "a leaf".

== Distribution and habitat ==
Beaufortia orbifolia mainly occurs near Ravensthorpe in the Avon Wheatbelt, Coolgardie, Esperance Plains and Mallee biogeographic regions. It usually grows in soils derived from laterite or granite on stony plains.

== Conservation ==
Beaufortia orbifolia is classified as "not threatened" by the Western Australian Government Department of Biodiversity, Conservation and Attractions.
