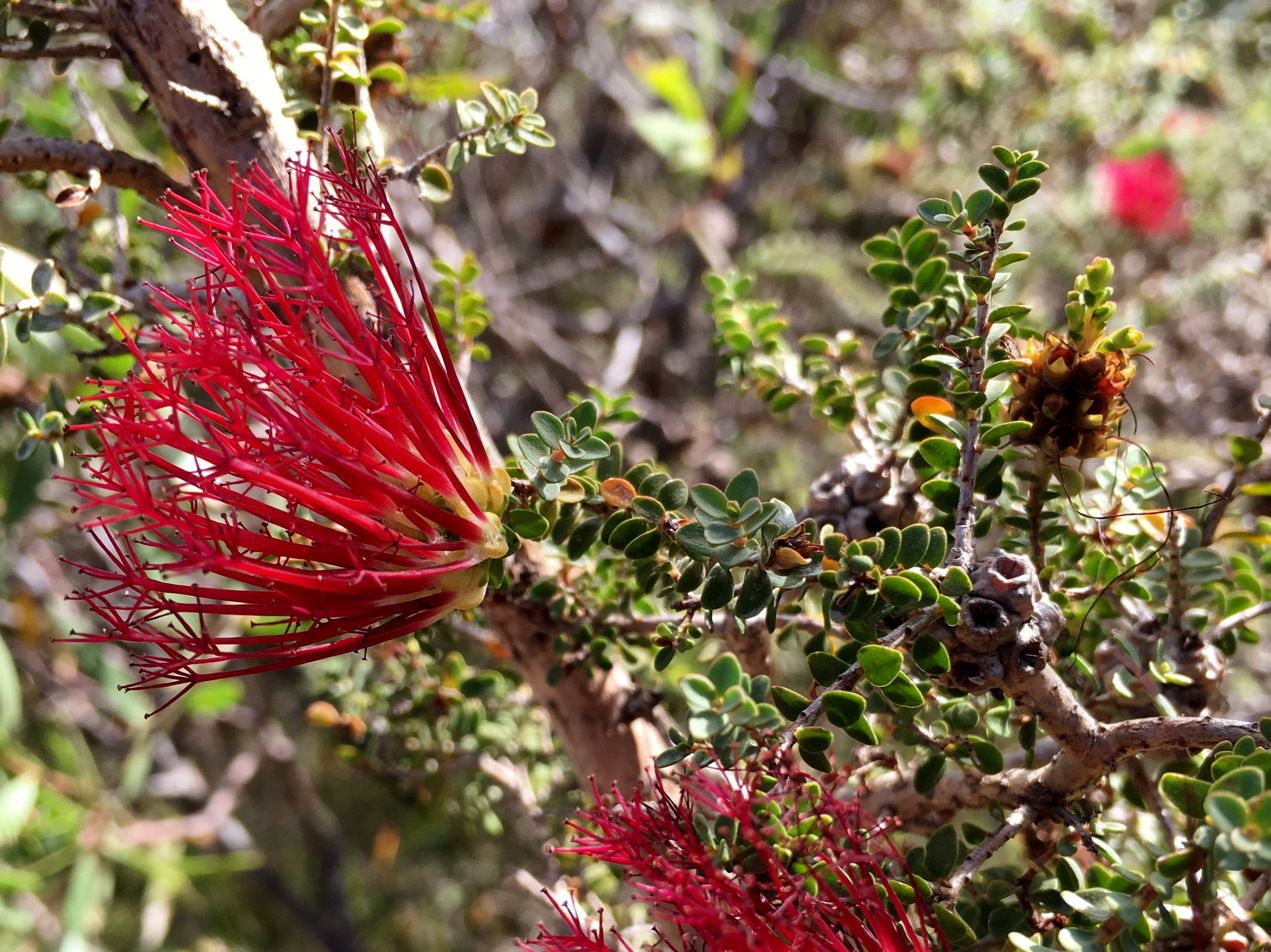
- Beaufortia elegans in the Stirling Range National Park

Scientific classification
- Kingdom: Plantae
- Clade: Tracheophytes
- Clade: Angiosperms
- Clade: Eudicots
- Clade: Rosids
- Order: Myrtales
- Family: Myrtaceae
- Genus: Beaufortia
- Species: B. elegans

Binomial name
- Beaufortia elegans Schauer

Synonyms
- Beaufortia elegans Schauer var. elegans; Melaleuca scitula Craven & R.D.Edwards

= Beaufortia elegans =

Elegant beaufortia

Species of flowering plant

Beaufortia elegans, commonly known as elegant beaufortia, is a species of flowering plant in the myrtle family, Myrtaceae and is endemic to the southwest of Western Australia. It is an erect, diffuse shrub with crowded, curved leaves and heads of flowers that are usually reddish purple, although other colours also occur.

== Description ==
Beaufortia elegans is an erect, usually spreading shrub which grows to a height of 2.5 metres (8 ft). The leaves are arranged in opposite pairs and are 2–5 millimetres (0.08–0.2 in) long, crowded, dished, curved and lacking a stalk.

The flowers are usually red to dark purplish red but other colours and white flowers are sometimes seen. They are arranged in heads about 20 millimetres (0.8 in) in diameter, on the ends of branches which continue to grow after flowering. The flowers have 5 sepals, 5 petals and 5 bundles of stamens. Each bundle contains 4 to 7 stamens joined for about 3–4 millimetres (0.1–0.2 in) long of their length with the free parts a further 4–6 millimetres (0.2–0.2 in) long. Flowering occurs from June to January but mostly from October to December and is followed by fruits which are woody, almost spherical capsules 8–10 millimetres (0.3–0.4 in) in diameter.

== Taxonomy and naming ==
Beaufortia elegans was first formally described in 1843 by Johannes Conrad Schauer in Dissertatio phytographica de Regelia, Beaufortia et Calothamno. The specific epithet (elegans) is a Latin word meaning "fine", "choice" or "tasteful".

== Distribution and habitat ==
Beaufortia elegans mainly occurs between Perth and Geraldton in the Avon Wheatbelt, Geraldton Sandplains, Jarrah Forest and Swan Coastal Plain bioregions of south-western Western Australia. It usually grows in sand in kwongan vegetation often over laterite on plains and in areas that are wet in winter.

== Conservation ==
Beaufortia elegans is classified as "not threatened" by the Western Australian Government Department of Biodiversity, Conservation and Attractions.
