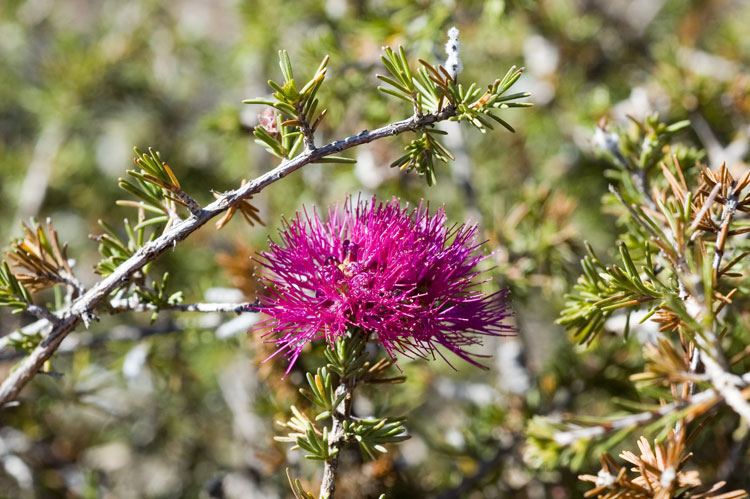

Scientific classification
- Kingdom: Plantae
- Clade: Tracheophytes
- Clade: Angiosperms
- Clade: Eudicots
- Clade: Rosids
- Order: Myrtales
- Family: Myrtaceae
- Genus: Beaufortia
- Species: B. puberula

Binomial name
- Beaufortia puberula Turcz.

Synonyms
- Beaufortia interstans F.Muell.; Beaufortia micrantha var. puberula Benth.; Melaleuca interstans (F.Muell.) Craven & R.D.Edwards; Melaleuca micrantha var. puberula (Benth.) Craven & R.D.Edwards

= Beaufortia puberula =

Hairy-leaved beaufortia

Species of flowering plant

Beaufortia puberula, commonly known as hairy-leaved beaufortia, is a plant in the myrtle family, Myrtaceae and is endemic to the southwest of Western Australia. It is a shrub growing to a height of about 2 m (7 ft) with hairy young leaves and heads of hairy, pink or red flowers during most of the year.

== Description ==
Beaufortia puberula is a shrub which grows to a height of 2 m (7 ft), sometimes spreading to 2 m (7 ft) wide. The leaves are arranged in opposite pairs and are 1.5–4 mm (0.06–0.2 in) long, 1–1.5 mm (0.04–0.06 in) wide and hairy, or hairy when young.

The flowers are pink or deep pink to red and are arranged in heads on the ends of the branches. The flowers have 5 sepals, 5 petals and 5 bundles of stamens. The stamen bundles are about 1–3 mm (0.04–0.1 in) long with 5 to 7 separate stamen filaments a further 1–2.5 mm (0.04–0.1 in) long. The inner surface of the bundles is glabrous but the outer face in covered with long hairs. Flowering occurs in most months and is followed by fruit which are woody capsules 10–16 mm (0.4–0.6 in) long and about 5 mm (0.2 in) in diameter, joined in clusters.

== Taxonomy and naming ==
Beaufortia puberula was first formally described in 1852 by Nikolai Turczaninow and the description was published in Bulletin de la Classe Physico-Mathématique de l'Académie Impériale des Sciences de Saint-Pétersbourg. The specific epithet (puberula) is a Latin word meaning "downy". In 1876, Ferdinand von Mueller described Beaufortia interstans in his Fragmenta Phytographiae Australiae, but that name is considered to be a synonym.

== Distribution and habitat ==
Hairy beaufortia grows in sand, sometimes with laterite or loam and occurs near Merredin, Katanning and Southern Cross in the Avon Wheatbelt, Coolgardie, Geraldton Sandplains, Jarrah Forest and Mallee bioregions of south-western Western Australia.

== Conservation ==
Beaufortia puberula is classified as "not threatened" by the Western Australian Government Department of Biodiversity, Conservation and Attractions.
