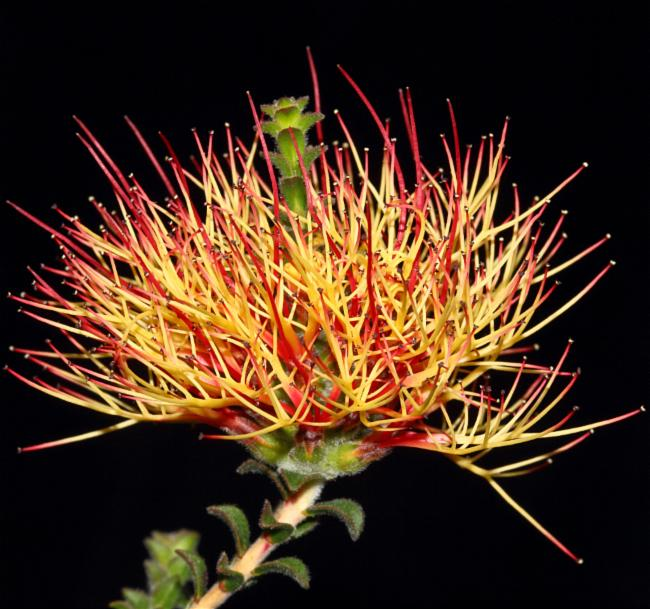
- Beaufortia bicolor near Coorow

Conservation status
- Priority Three — Poorly Known Taxa (DEC)

Scientific classification
- Kingdom: Plantae
- Clade: Tracheophytes
- Clade: Angiosperms
- Clade: Eudicots
- Clade: Rosids
- Order: Myrtales
- Family: Myrtaceae
- Genus: Beaufortia
- Species: B. bicolor

Binomial name
- Beaufortia bicolor Strid

Synonyms
- Melaleuca variegata Craven & R.D.Edwards

= Beaufortia bicolor =

Badgingarra beaufortia

Species of flowering plant

Beaufortia bicolor, commonly known as Badgingarra beaufortia, is a plant in the myrtle family, Myrtaceae and is endemic to Southwest Australia. It is a densely branched shrub with rough, peeling bark, elliptical, upward pointing leaves and heads of red, orange and yellow flowers in November or December. It has been classified as a "poorly known" species.

== Description ==
Beaufortia bicolor is a densely branched shrub which grows to a height of about 1 m (3 ft) and about 0.5 m (2 ft) wide. The leaves are arranged in opposite pairs (decussate) so that they make four rows along the stems. The leaves are 2.8–4 mm (0.1–0.2 in) long, 1.2–1.9 mm (0.05–0.07 in) long, usually hairy and are bird-winged in cross section.

The flowers are red, orange and yellow and are arranged in dense heads on the ends of branches which continue to grow after flowering. Interspersed between the flowers are tufts of white hairs. The flowers have 5 sepals, 5 petals and 5 bundles of stamens. The stamens are usually yellow to orange in the lower half with red ends and are joined for about half their length. The 5 separate filaments extending beyond the joined part but branching at two different points. Flowering occurs throughout the year but mainly from October to January, and is followed by fruit which are woody capsules, arranged in small clusters around the stem.

== Taxonomy and naming ==
Beaufortia bicolor was first formally described in 1987 by the Swedish botanist, Arne Strid in Plant Systematics and Evolution from a specimen found near Badgingarra.

== Distribution and habitat ==
Beaufortia bicolor occurs between Perth and Geraldton in the Avon Wheatbelt, Geraldton Sandplains and Swan Coastal Plain bioregions of south-western Western Australia. It grows on sandplains in white sand over laterite.

== Conservation ==
Beaufortia bicolor is classified as "Priority Three" by the Western Australian Government Department of Biodiversity, Conservation and Attractions meaning that it is poorly known and known from only a few locations but is not under imminent threat.
