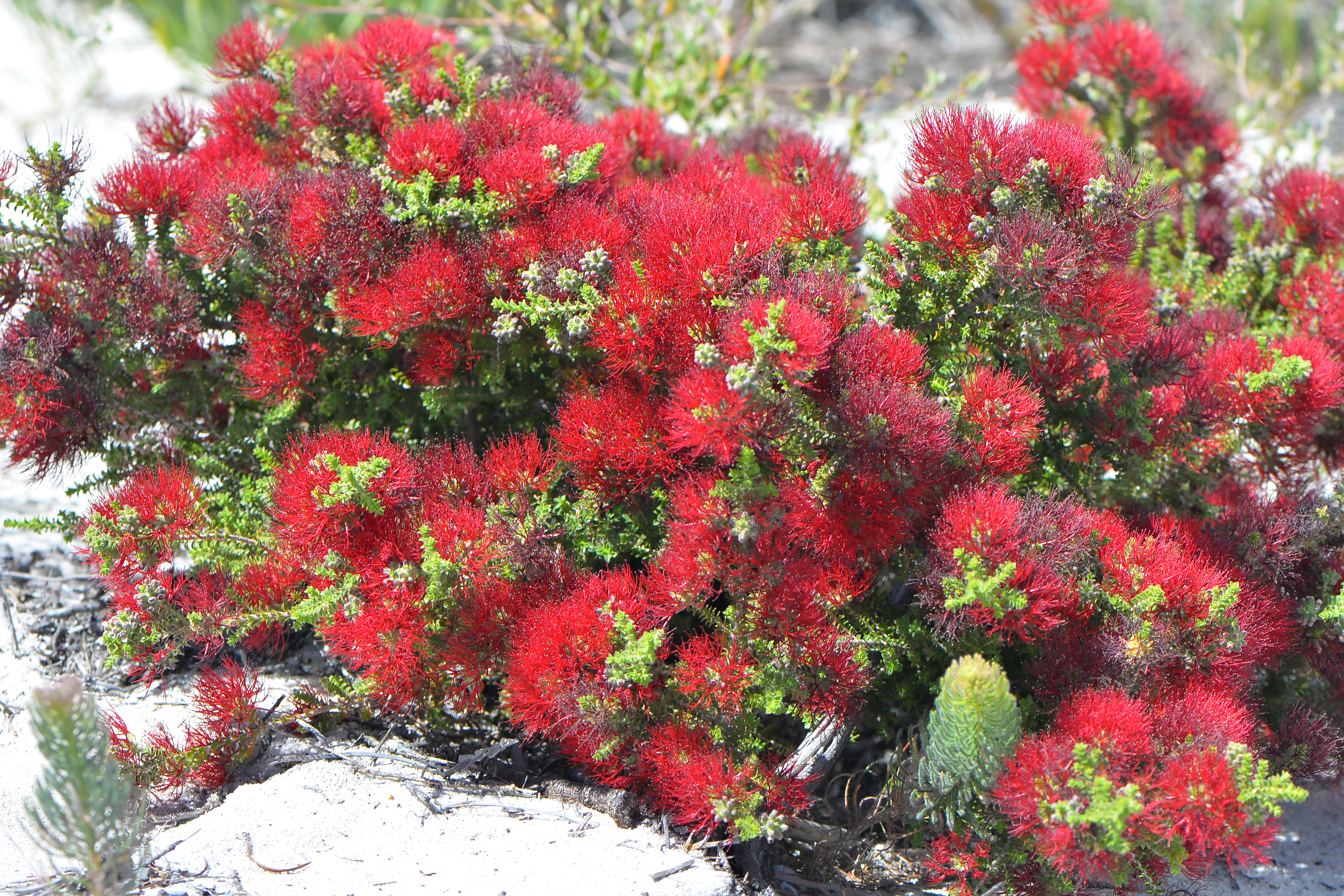

Scientific classification
- Kingdom: Plantae
- Clade: Tracheophytes
- Clade: Angiosperms
- Clade: Eudicots
- Clade: Rosids
- Order: Myrtales
- Family: Myrtaceae
- Genus: Beaufortia
- Species: B. kwongkanicola

Binomial name
- Beaufortia kwongkanicola A.A.Burb

= Beaufortia kwongkanicola =

Species of flowering plant

Beaufortia kwongkanicola, commonly known as Lesueur beaufortia, is a plant in the myrtle family, Myrtaceae and is endemic to the southwest of Western Australia. It is a shrub with crowded leaves and large, deep purple heads of flowers in late winter and spring and is found in the northern kwongkan.

== Description ==
Beaufortia kwongkanicola is a shrub which grows to a height and width of 1 m (3 ft). The leaves are arranged in opposite pairs, are linear to narrow egg-shaped, 3–8 mm (0.1–0.3 in) long, 1–2.5 mm (0.04–0.1 in) wide and are often crowded.

The flowers are arranged in heads on the ends of the branches and have 5 sepals, 5 petals and 5 bundles of stamens. The stamen bundles are deep red to purple, 3–8 mm (0.1–0.3 in) long and densely hairy on the inner surface. There are 5 to 7 stamens in each bundle and the free ends of the stamens separate from the bundle at different points. Flowering occurs from July to November and is followed by fruit which are woody capsules, 10–13.5 mm (0.4–0.5 in) long and about 8 mm (0.3 in) wide and densely clustered.

== Taxonomy and naming ==
Beaufortia kwongkanicola was first formally described in 2016 by Andrew A. Burbidge and the description was published in Nuytsia. The specific epithet ("kwongkanicola") refers to the kwongkan vegetation with which this species is found.

== Distribution and habitat ==
Column beaufortia grows in sandy soils often over laterite and in the Lesueur sandplain region including the Avon Wheatbelt, Geraldton Sandplains and Swan Coastal Plain bioregions of south-western Western Australia.

== Conservation ==
Beaufortia kwongkanicola is classified as "Not Threatened" by the Western Australian Government Department of Biodiversity, Conservation and Attractions.
