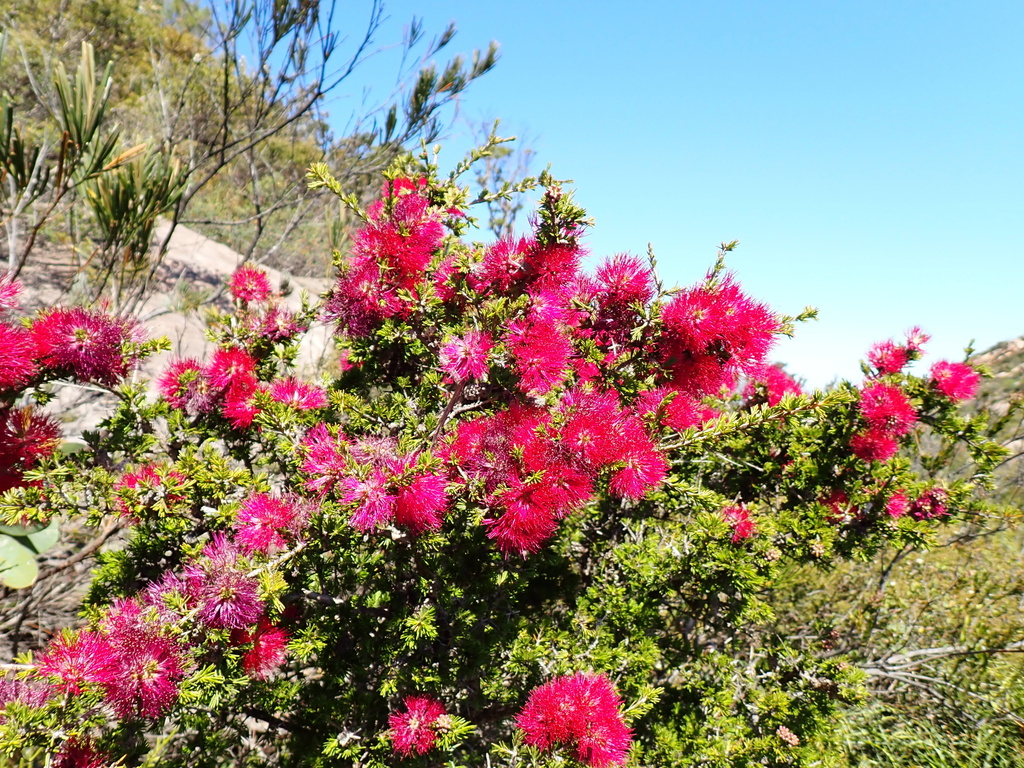
- In Cape Arid National Park

Conservation status
- Priority Two — Poorly Known Taxa (DEC)

Scientific classification
- Kingdom: Plantae
- Clade: Embryophytes
- Clade: Tracheophytes
- Clade: Spermatophytes
- Clade: Angiosperms
- Clade: Eudicots
- Clade: Rosids
- Order: Myrtales
- Family: Myrtaceae
- Genus: Beaufortia
- Species: B. raggedensis

Binomial name
- Beaufortia raggedensis A.A.Burb.

= Beaufortia raggedensis =

Species of flowering plant

Beaufortia raggedensis, commonly known as Mount Ragged beaufortia, is a plant in the myrtle family, Myrtaceae and is endemic to the southwest of Western Australia. It is a compact shrub with densely clustered leaves and large heads of deep red flowers in spring and only occurs near Mount Arid in the Cape Arid National Park.

== Description ==
Beaufortia raggedensis is usually a compact shrub, sometimes openly branched, which grows to a height of 1.5 metres (5 ft). The leaves are arranged in opposite pairs and are linear in shape, 5–10 millimetres (0.2–0.4 in) long, less than 1 millimetre (0.04 in) wide and are often in dense clusters. They often have a covering of fine hairs, giving them a greyish appearance.

The flowers are deep red and are arranged in heads on the ends of branches. The flowers have 5 sepals, 5 petals and 5 bundles of stamens. The bundles contain between 5 and 7 stamens and are joined for 5–10 millimetres (0.2–0.4 in) with the free stamens branching at different points. Flowering occurs from September to December and is followed by fruits which are woody capsules 15–20 millimetres (0.6–0.8 in) long, 10 millimetres (0.4 in) wide and joined together.

== Taxonomy and naming ==
Melaleuca raggedensis was first formally described in 2016 by Andrew A. Burbidge and the description was published in Nuytsia. The specific epithet ("raggedensis") refers to the Mount Ragged, near which this species is found.

== Distribution and habitat ==
Beaufortia raggedensis grows in quartzite, only on the slopes and bases of mountains of the Russell Range in the Cape Arid National Park, Mallee bioregion.

== Conservation ==
Beaufortia raggedensis is classified as "Priority Two" by the Western Australian Government Department of Biodiversity, Conservation and Attractions, meaning that it is poorly known and from only one or a few locations.
