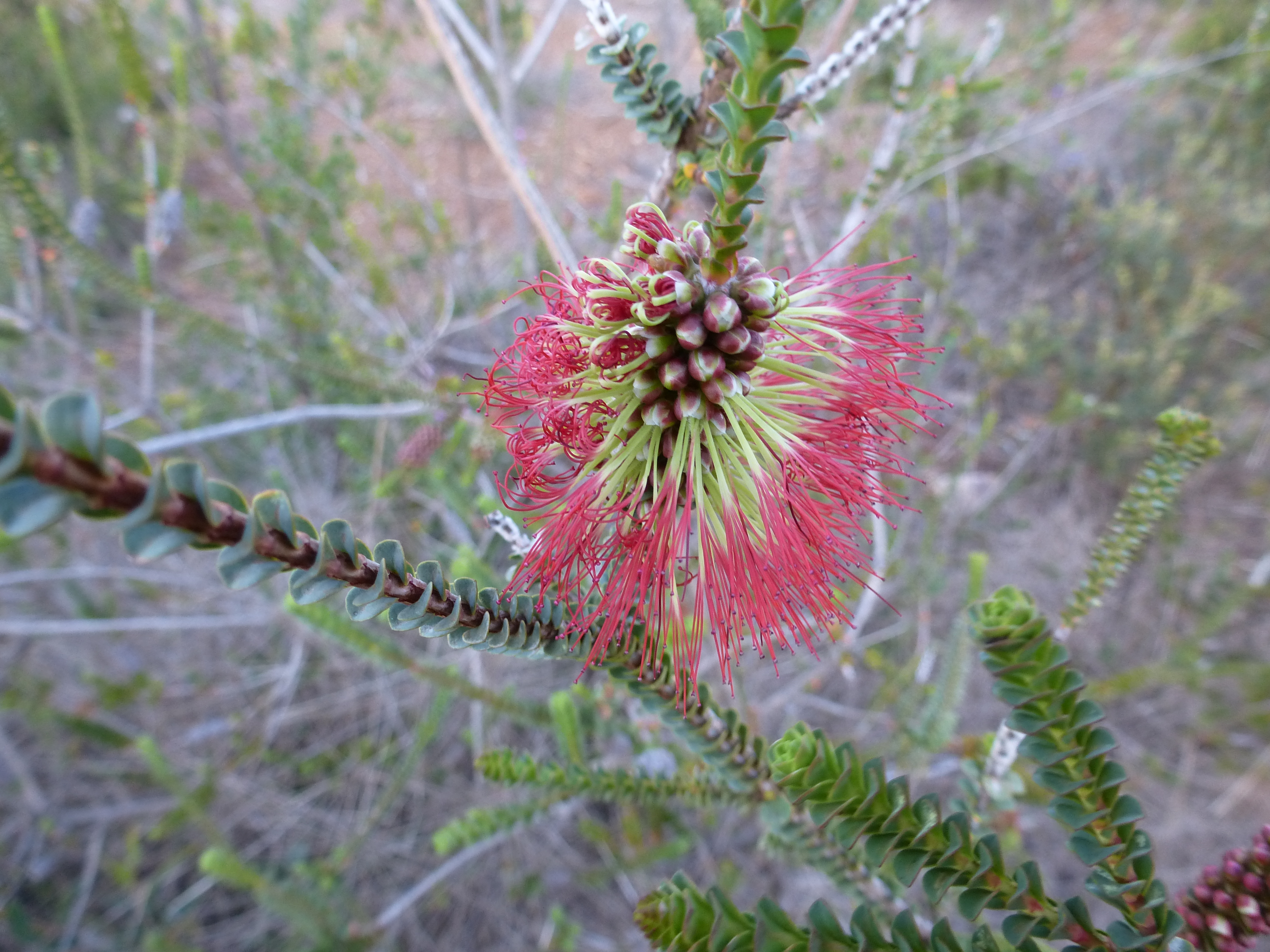
- B. orbifolia growing near Ravensthorpe

Scientific classification
- Kingdom: Plantae
- Clade: Tracheophytes
- Clade: Angiosperms
- Clade: Eudicots
- Clade: Rosids
- Order: Myrtales
- Family: Myrtaceae
- Subfamily: Myrtoideae
- Tribe: Melaleuceae
- Genus: Beaufortia; R.Br.

Synonyms
- Beaufortia sect. Eubeaufortia Schauer nom. inval.; Beaufortia sect. Eubeaufortia Schauer nom. inval.; Beaufortia sect. Eubeaufortia Schauer nom. inval.; Beaufortia sect. Schizopleura Lindl.; Beaufortiae Lindl. orth. var.; Beaufortiae sect. Schizopleura Lindl. orth. var.; Schizopleura (Lindl.) Endl.

= Beaufortia (plant) =

Genus of flowering plants

Beaufortia is a genus of woody shrubs and small trees in the family Myrtaceae and is endemic to Southwest Australia. The genus Beaufortia is closely related to Melaleuca, Calothamnus, Regelia and several others, differing mainly in the way the anthers are attached to the stalks of the stamens, and in the way they open to release their pollen. Beaufortia anthers are attached at one end and open by splitting at the other.

== Description ==
Plants in the genus Beaufortia, sometimes commonly known as bottlebrush are evergreen shrubs with very small, glandular, aromatic leaves usually oppositely arranged. The tallest are up to 3 m (10 ft) in height. Most are andromonoecious, meaning they have both male and bisexual flowers on one plant. The flowers are in spikelike or headlike inflorescences. The flower has five triangular sepals and five white, yellow, red, pink, or purple petals, which are sometimes hairy. The petals usually fall off as the flower opens, or shortly after that. The stamens are red or deep pink, arranged in five bundles and extend well beyond the petals, giving the inflorescence its colour. Unlike other closely related genera such as Melaleuca, the anthers are attached to the filament at their base and release their pollen through two curved slits on the other end. Flowering in most species occurs throughout the year but mostly between late spring and autumn. The fruit is a dehiscent capsule with three valves, each holding a winged seed.

== Taxonomy and naming ==
The first formal description of the genus Beaufortia was published in 1812 by Robert Brown in William Aiton's Hortus Kewensis. It was followed by a description of the first-named species, Beaufortia decussata. The genus was named for the English gardener and botanist Mary Somerset, Duchess of Beaufort. In Curtis's Botanical Magazine it is noted that "her grace possessed a flourishing botanical garden at her seat, at Badminton, in Gloucestershire". Some taxonomists have suggested that Beaufortia along with Calothamnus, Conothamnus, Eremaea, Lamarchea, Petraeomyrtus, Phymatocarpus and Regelia should be included in the genus Melaleuca but the change has not been adopted by most herbaria.

== Distribution and habitat ==
All species of Beaufortia occur in the South West Botanical Province and about half the species also occur in the Eremaean province. Beaufortias are often found in sand plain and in heath, although Beaufortia sparsa usually grows in marshy places and is known by the common name swamp bottlebrush.

== Ecology ==
Most beaufortias are serotinous, only reproducing from seed, released from the fruit after fire. Several species which occur in areas where fire is frequent, have a lignotuber which resprouts after fire. Honeyeaters (Family Meliphagidae) and the honey possum (Tarsipes rostratus) are thought to be the main pollinators but many kinds of insect have also been recorded on beaufortia flowers.

== Conservation ==
Some species of Beaufortia are common within their range but several, including Beaufortia bicolor, are classified as "Priority Three" by the Western Australian Government Department of Parks and Wildlife, meaning that they are poorly known and known from only a few locations but are not under imminent threat.

== Use in cultivation ==
All the species of Beaufortia are worth trialling in the garden but few have been grown successfully in eastern Australia. They require full sun and excellent drainage and benefit from being grown over limestone. Grafting onto Kunzea ambigua may also improve the chance of success.

== Species list ==
The following is a list of the 22 species of Beaufortia recognised by the Australian Plant Census and Western Australian Herbarium as at March 2020:

- Beaufortia aestiva K.J.Brooks – Kalbarri beaufortia
- Beaufortia anisandra Schauer – dark beaufortia
- Beaufortia bicolor Strid - Badgingarra beaufortia
- Beaufortia bracteosa Diels
- Beaufortia burbidgeae A.A.Burb. – column beaufortia
- Beaufortia cyrtodonta (Turcz.) Benth. – Stirling Range beaufortia
- Beaufortia decussata R.Br. – gravel bottlebrush
- Beaufortia elegans Schauer – elegant beaufortia
- Beaufortia empetrifolia (Rchb.) Schauer – south coast beaufortia
- Beaufortia eriocephala W.Fitzg. – woolly beaufortia
- Beaufortia incana (Benth.) A.S.George –grey-leaved beaufortia
- Beaufortia kwongkanicola A.A.Burb. – Lesueur beaufortia
- Beaufortia macrostemon Lindl. – Darling Range beaufortia
- Beaufortia micrantha Schauer – small-leaved beaufortia
- Beaufortia orbifolia F.Muell. – Ravensthorpe bottlebrush
- Beaufortia puberula Turcz. – hairy-leaved beaufortia
- Beaufortia purpurea Lindl. – purple beaufortia
- Beaufortia raggedensis A.A.Burb. Mount Ragged beaufortia
- Beaufortia schaueri Schauer – pink beaufortia
- Beaufortia sparsa R.Br. – swamp bottlebrush
- Beaufortia sprengelioides (DC.) Craven – Shark Bay beaufortia
- Beaufortia squarrosa Schauer – sand bottlebrush
