= Ragged Mountain (Utah) =

Mountain in Utah, United States

- Location within Utah

Highest point
- Elevation: 9,113 ft (2,778 m) NGVD 29
- Prominence: 1,116 ft (340 m)
- Coordinates: 38°01′13″N 110°45′34″W

Geography
- Location: Garfield County, Utah, U.S
- Topo map: USGS Mount Ellen

Ragged Mountain is a summit in Garfield County, Utah, in the United States with an elevation of 9,113 feet (2,778 m) NGVD 29.

Ragged Mountain was named for its jagged peak.
