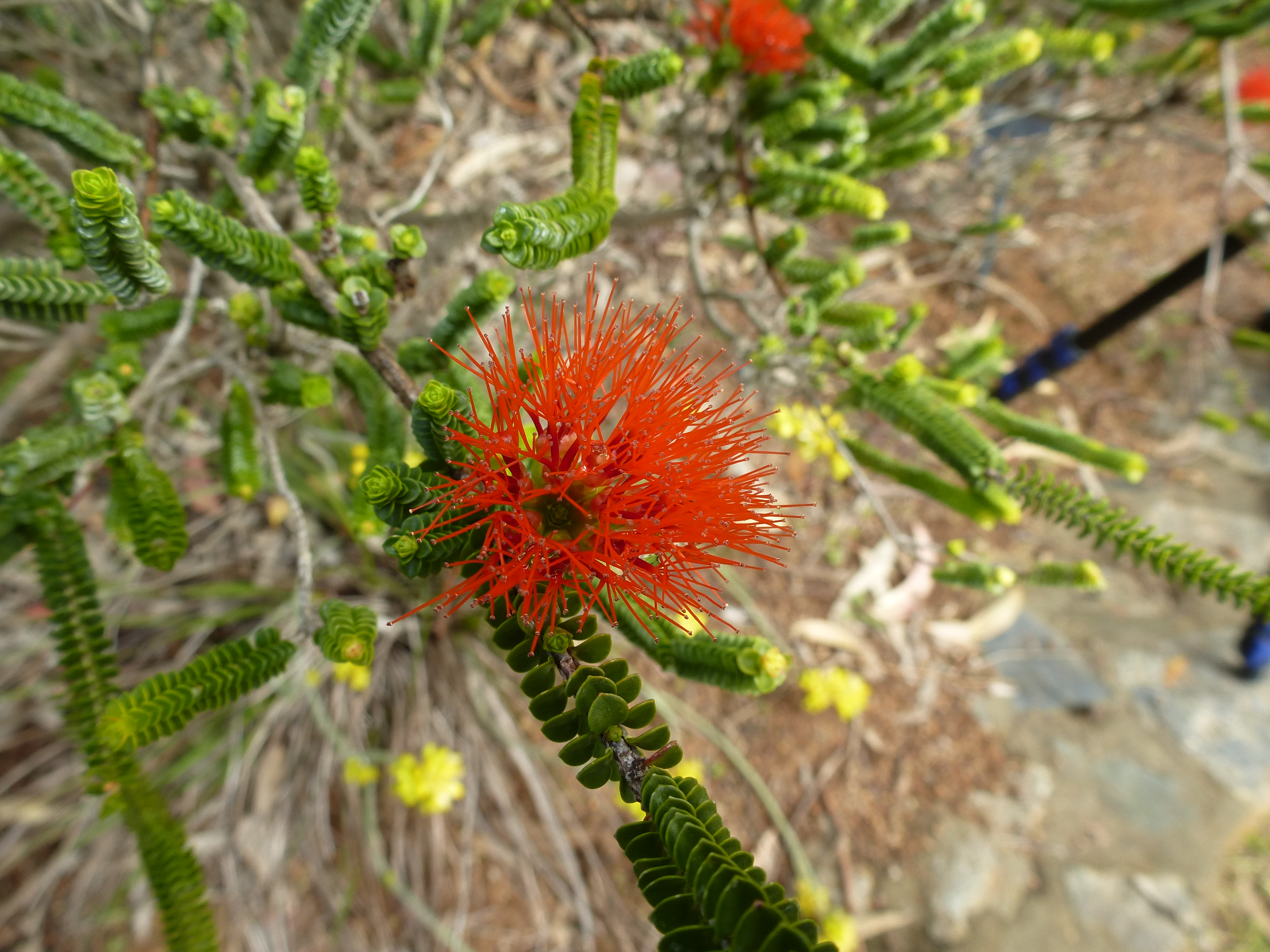
- Beaufortia squarrosa in Kings Park

Scientific classification
- Kingdom: Plantae
- Clade: Tracheophytes
- Clade: Angiosperms
- Clade: Eudicots
- Clade: Rosids
- Order: Myrtales
- Family: Myrtaceae
- Genus: Beaufortia
- Species: B. squarrosa

Binomial name
- Beaufortia squarrosa Schauer

Synonyms
- Melaleuca pulcherrima Craven & R.D.Edwards

= Beaufortia squarrosa =

Sand bottlebrush

Species of plant

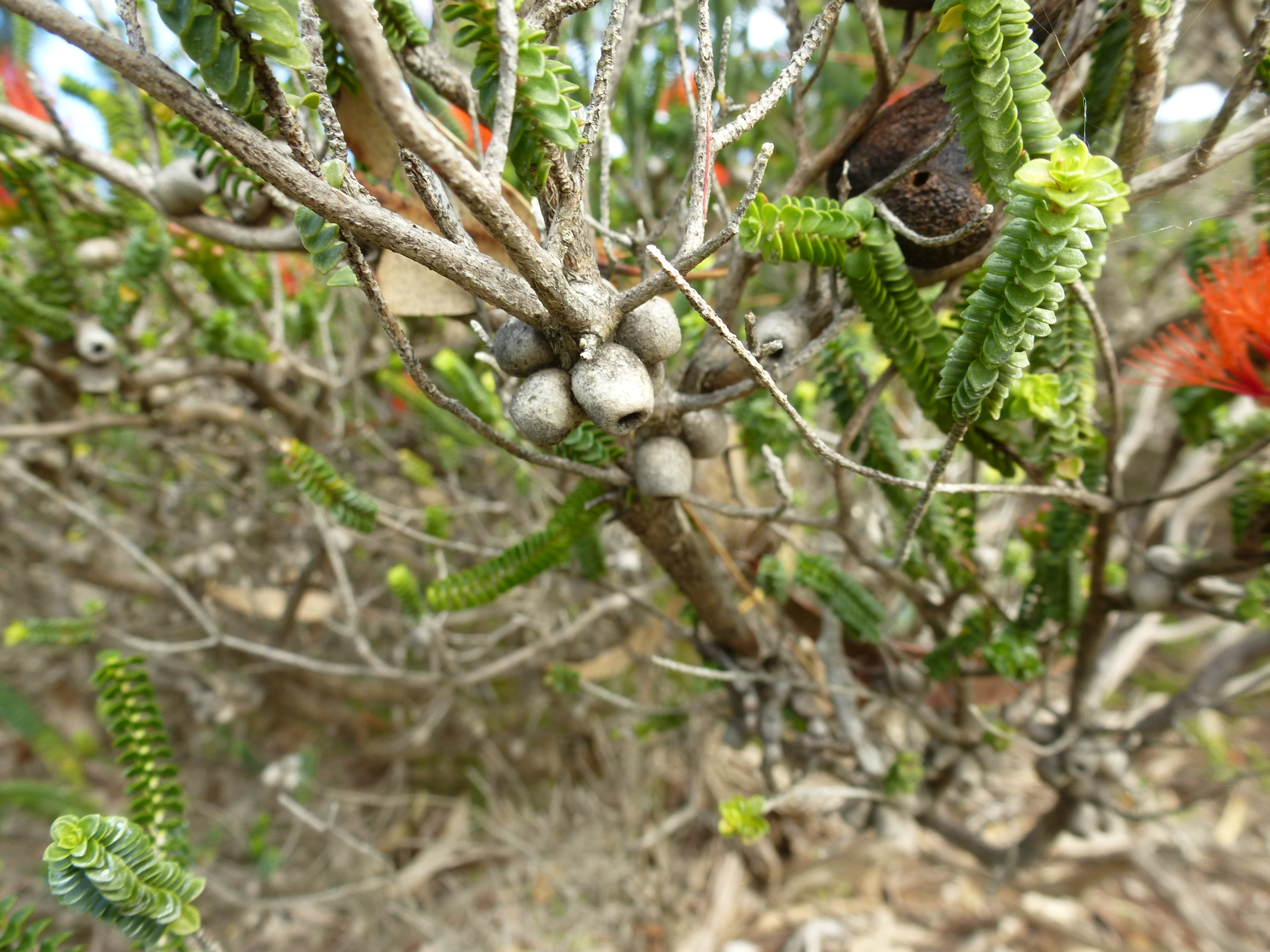
Fruit

Beaufortia squarrosa, commonly known as sand bottlebrush, is a species of flowering plant in the myrtle family, Myrtaceae and is endemic to the southwest of Western Australia. The Noongar peoples know the plant as buno. It is sometimes a dense shrub, others straggling with 4 neat rows of small, oval leaves along the stems, and heads of red, orange or yellow flowers in the warmer months.

== Description ==
Beaufortia squarrosa is a shrub which grows to a height of about 2 metres (7 ft). The leaves are crowded and arranged in alternating pairs (decussate) so that they make four rows along the stems. The leaves are egg-shaped to oval, less than 4.5 millimetres (0.2 in) long and have 5 or 7 veins.

The flowers are usually bright red but sometimes orange or yellow and are arranged in roughly spherical heads on the ends of branches which continue to grow after flowering. The flowers have 5 sepals, 5 petals and 5 bundles of stamens. The stamen bundles, which give the flower its colour, contain 3 to 7 stamens and are joined for more than half their length. Flowering occurs from July to December or from January to May and is followed by fruits which are woody capsules.

== Taxonomy and naming ==
Beaufortia squarrosa was first formally described in 1843 by Johannes Conrad Schauer in Dissertatio phytographica de Regelia, Beaufortia et Calothamno. The specific epithet is derived from the Latin word squarrosus, meaning "rough with stiff scales, bracts, leaves or processes".

== Distribution and habitat ==
Beaufortia squarrosa mainly occurs on the coastal plain between the Busselton and Eneabba districts in the Avon Wheatbelt, Geraldton Sandplains, Jarrah Forest and Swan Coastal Plain biogeographic regions. It usually grows in sand plains and depressions that are wet in winter.

== Conservation ==
Beaufortia squarrosa is classified as "not threatened" by the Western Australian Government Department of Biodiversity, Conservation and Attractions.
