= M. concinna =

M. concinna may refer to:

- Macrozamia concinna, an Australian plant
- Melaleuca concinna, an Oceanian myrtle
- Mitra concinna, a sea snail
- Monistria concinna, a gaudy grasshopper
- Montereina concinna, a sea slug
- Mordellistena concinna, a tumbling flower beetle
