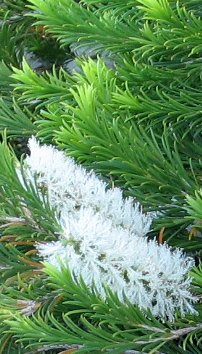
- Melaleuca armillaris foliage and flowers

Scientific classification
- Kingdom: Plantae
- Clade: Tracheophytes
- Clade: Angiosperms
- Clade: Eudicots
- Clade: Rosids
- Order: Myrtales
- Family: Myrtaceae
- Subfamily: Myrtoideae
- Tribe: Melaleuceae
- Genus: Melaleuca; L.

Species
- See List of Melaleuca species

Synonyms
- Genus synonymy: Baudinia Lesch. ex DC.; Beaufortia R.Br.; Billottia Colla; Cajuputi Adans. ex A.Lyons, nom. illeg. superfl.; Callistemon R.Br.; Calothamnus Labill.; Conothamnus Lindl.; Eremaea Lindl.; Eremaeopsis Kuntze, nom. illeg. superfl.; Gymnagathis Schauer; Kajuputi Adans. nom. rej.; Lamarchea Gaudich.; Lamarkea Rchb. orth. var.; Meladendron St.-Lag., nom. illeg.; Melaleucon St.-Lag. orth. var.; Melanoleuce St.-Lag. orth. var.; Myrtoleucodendron Burm. ex Kuntze, nom. illeg. superfl.; Ozandra Raf.; Petraeomyrtus Craven; Phymatocarpus F.Muell.; Regelia Schauer; Schizopleura Endl.; Trichobasis Turcz. nom. illeg. homonym. post.

= Melaleuca =

Genus of plants in the myrtle family

Melaleuca (/ˌmɛləˈljuːkə/) is a genus of nearly 300 species of plants in the myrtle family, Myrtaceae, commonly known as paperbarks, honey-myrtles, bottlebrushes or tea-trees (although the last name is also applied to species of Leptospermum). They range in size from small shrubs that rarely grow to more than 1 m (3 ft 3 in) high, to trees up to 35 m (115 ft). Their flowers generally occur in groups, forming a "head" or "spike" resembling a brush used for cleaning bottles, containing up to 80 individual flowers.

Melaleucas are an important food source for nectarivorous insects, birds, and mammals. Many are popular garden plants, either for their attractive flowers or as dense screens and a few have economic value for producing fencing and oils such as "tea tree" oil. Most melaleucas are endemic to Australia, with a few also occurring in Malesia. Seven are endemic to New Caledonia, and one is found only on Australia's Lord Howe Island.

Melaleucas are found in a wide variety of habitats. Many are adapted for life in swamps and boggy places, while others thrive in the poorest of sandy soils or on the edge of saltpans. Some have a wide distribution and are common, whilst others are rare and endangered. Land clearing, exotic myrtle rust, and especially draining and clearing of swamps threaten many species.

== Description ==
Melaleucas range in size from small shrubs such as M. aspalathoides and M. concinna which rarely grow to more than 1 m (3 ft 3 in) high, to trees like M. cajuputi and M. quinquenervia, which can reach 35 m (115 ft). (One specimen of M. cajuputi reached a height of 46 m (151 ft).)

Many, like M. lineariifolia, are known as paperbarks and have bark that can be peeled in thin sheets, whilst about 20% of the genus, including M. bracteata, have hard, rough bark and another 20% have fibrous bark. All are evergreen, and the leaves vary in size from minute and scale-like (M. micromera) to 270 mm (11 in) long (M. leucadendra). Most have distinct oil glands dotted in the leaves, making the leaves aromatic, especially when crushed.

Melaleuca flowers are usually arranged in spikes or heads. Within the head or spike, the flowers are often in groups of two or three, each flower or group having a papery bract at its base. Five sepals occur, although these are sometimes fused into a ring of tissue and five petals which are usually small, not showy, and fall off as the flower opens or soon after. The stamens vary greatly in colour, from white to cream or yellow, red, or mauve with their yellow tips (the anthers) contrasting with their "stalks" (filaments).

The fruits are woody, cup-shaped, barrel-shaped, or almost spherical capsules, often arranged in clusters along the stems. The seeds are sometimes retained in the fruit for many years, only opening when the plant, or part of it, dies or is heated in a bushfire. In tropical areas, seeds are released annually in the wet season.

== Etymology ==
The name Melaleuca is derived from the Ancient Greek μέλας (mélas) meaning "dark" or "black" and λευκός (leukós) meaning "white", apparently because one of the first specimens described had fire-blackened white bark. The common name "tea tree" has been applied to species in the genera Leptospermum, Melaleuca, Kunzea, and Baeckea because the sailors on the Endeavour used the leaves of a shrub from one of these groups as a replacement for tea (Camellia sinensis) during Captain James Cook's 1770 voyage to Australia.

== Taxonomy ==
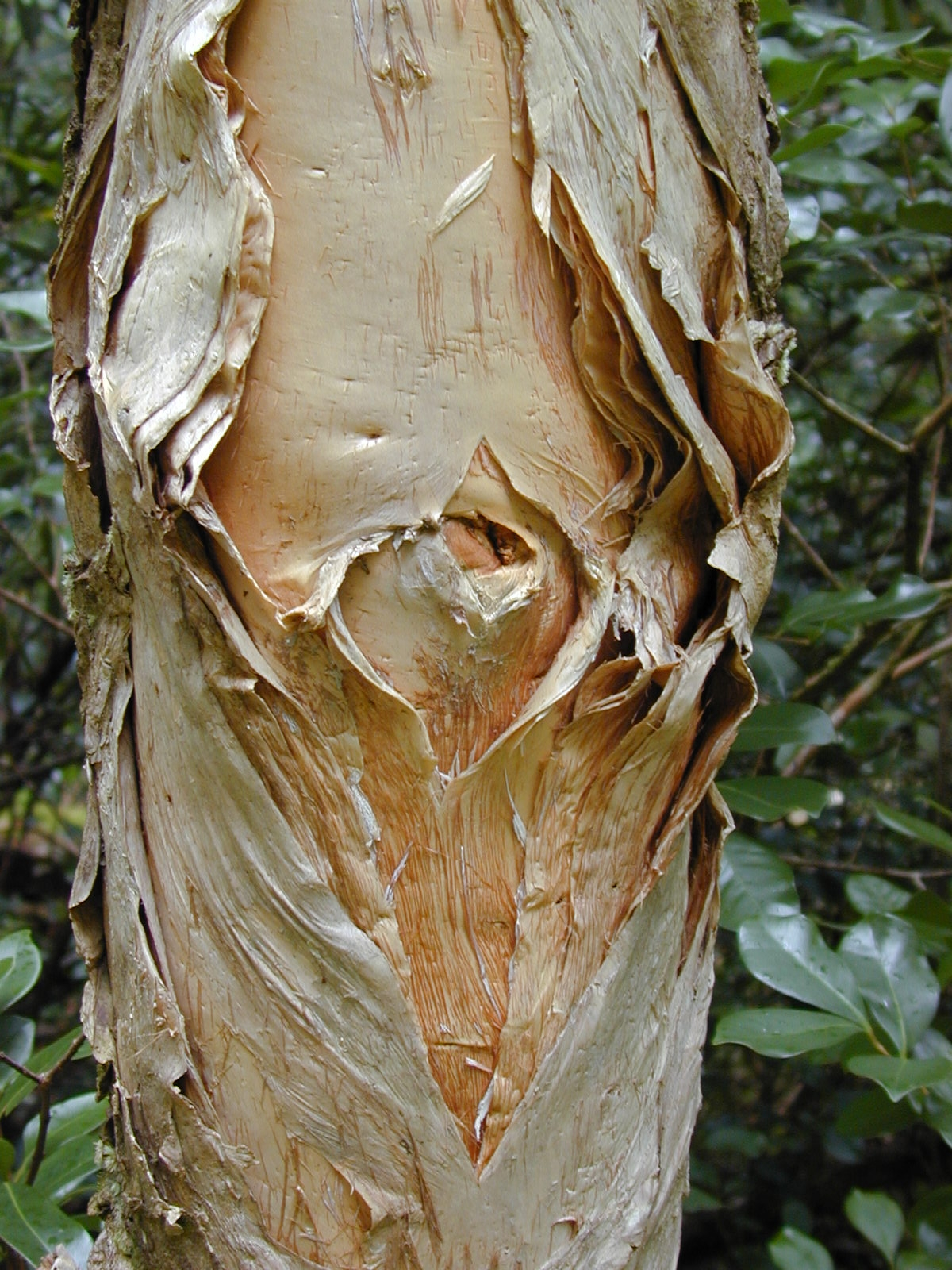
M. quinquenervia bark showing the papery exfoliation from which the common name "paperbark" derives

The first known description of a Melaleuca species was written by Rumphius in 1741, in Herbarium amboinense before the present system of naming plants was written. The plant he called Arbor alba is now known as Melaleuca leucadendra. The name Melaleuca was first used by Linnaeus in 1767. Many species previously known as Metrosideros were then placed in Melaleuca. In Australia, Melaleuca is the third most diverse plant genus with up to 300 species.

The genus Callistemon was raised by Robert Brown, who noted its similarity to Melaleuca, distinguishing it only on the basis of whether the stamens are free of each other, or joined in bundles. Botanists in the past, including Ferdinand von Mueller and Lyndley Craven have proposed uniting the two genera but the matter is not decided. Evidence from DNA studies suggests that either Callistemon and some other genera be incorporated into Melaleuca or that at least 10 new genera be created from the present genus.

In 2014, Lyndley Craven and others proposed, on the basis of DNA evidence and a lack of morphological support, that species in the genera Beaufortia, Calothamnus, Conothamnus, Eremaea, Lamarchea, Petraeomyrtus, Phymatocarpus and Regelia be transferred to Melaleuca. The World Checklist of Selected Plant Families maintained by the Royal Botanic Gardens, Kew lists Calothamnus and the other genera as synonyms of the accepted genus Melaleuca. The move has not been adopted by all Australian herbaria with some taxonomists, including Alex George opposing the move.

== Distribution and habitat ==
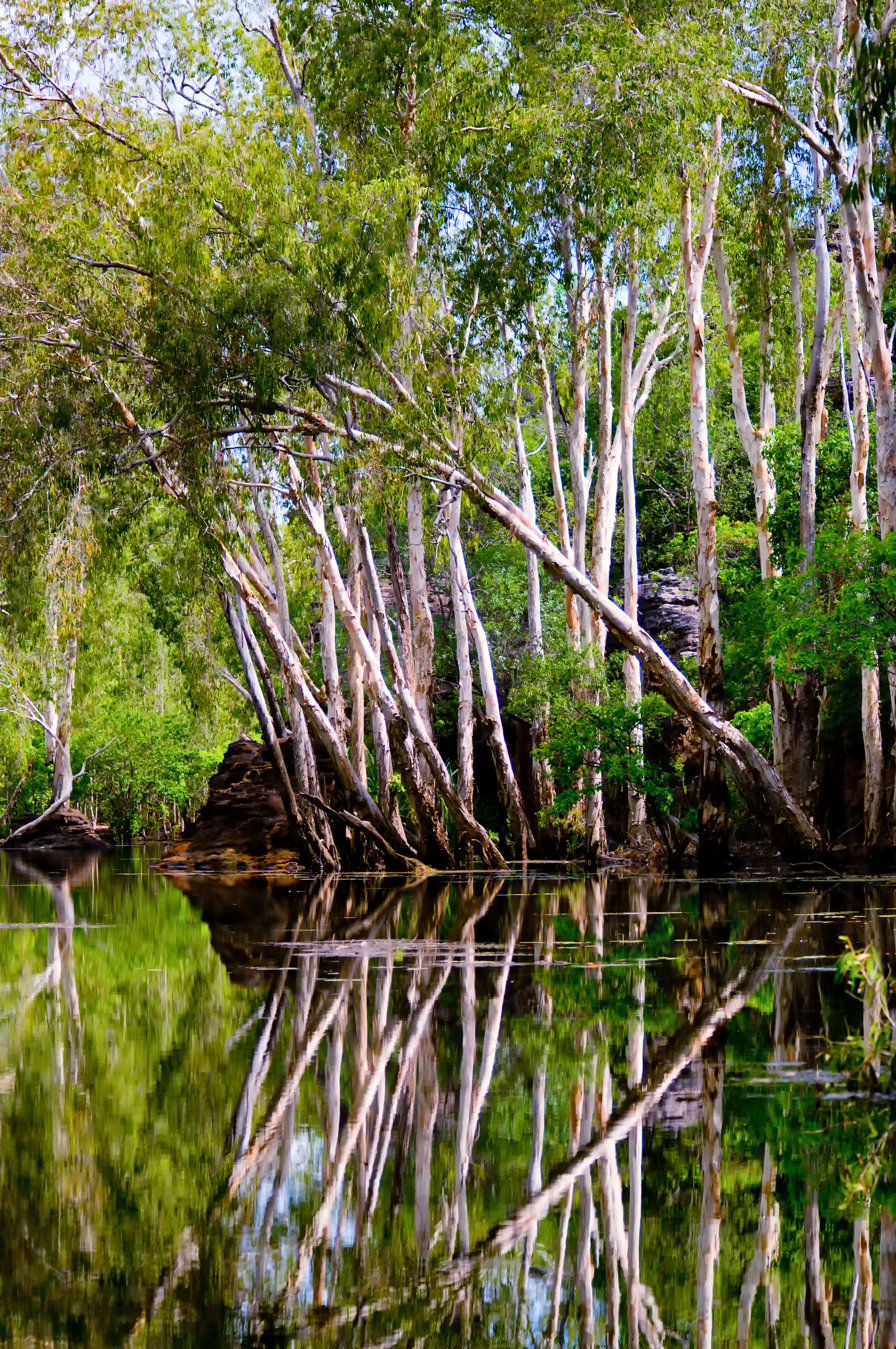
Paperbark trees on the East Alligator River in the Northern Territory

Most melaleucas occur naturally only on the Australian mainland. Eight occur in Tasmania, but only two are endemic to that island. One (M. howeana) is endemic to Lord Howe Island and seven are endemic to Grande Terre, the main island of New Caledonia. A few tropical species also occur in Papua New Guinea, and the distribution of one subspecies, Melaleuca cajuputi subsp. cumingiana extends as far north as Myanmar, Thailand, and Vietnam. The southwest of Western Australia has the greatest density of species, and in the tropical north of the continent, species such as M. argentea and M. leucadendra are the dominant species over large areas.

Melaleucas grow in a range of soil types and many tolerate occasional or even permanent waterlogging. Some species, especially the South Australian swamp paperbark, M. halmaturorum, thrive in saline soils where few other species survive. Many are fire tolerant, regenerating from epicormic buds or by coppicing, but no melaleucas occur in rainforest and few species occur in the arid zone.

== Ecology ==
Melaleucas are mostly pollinated by insects, including the introduced honey bee (Apis mellifera), flies, beetles, wasps and thrips. Birds such as lorikeets and honeyeaters as well as bats often visit the flowers and are probably also pollinators.

Some species of Melaleuca, especially M. alternifolia, are cultivated for the production of tea tree oil, and in plantations are susceptible to a number of insect pests. The most significant of these is the chrysomelid Paropsisterna tigrina, but other beetles, cutworm caterpillars (Agrotis species), psyllids, mole crickets (Gryllotalpa), and others cause significant damage. More than 100 species of insects are known to feed on melaleucas. Native stands have fewer predators, but tea tree sawfly (Pterygophorus species) and longicorn beetles are often found. The scale insect Beesonia ferrugineus forms round, fluffy-looking galls on branches of several Melaleuca species.

Melaleucas are also susceptible to myrtle rust (Puccinia psidii) which can result in damage to soft plant material and the death of highly susceptible hosts. Myrtle rust is common in eastern Australia, including Tasmania and has been detected in the Tiwi Islands.

=== Invasive species ===
Melaleuca quinquenervia (broad-leaved paperbark) is the most damaging of 60 exotic species introduced to the Florida Everglades to help drain low-lying swampy areas. Introduced in the early 20th century, it has become a serious invasive species, with damaging effects including the displacement of native species, reduction in wildlife habitat, alteration of hydrology, modification of soil, and changes in fire regimes. The tree's perseverance in the face of efforts to eradicate it has earned it the nickname "punktree".

== Uses ==
=== Traditional Aboriginal uses ===
Aboriginal Australians used several species of Melaleuca to make rafts, as roofing for shelter, bandages, and food preparation. "Bee bread" and honey were collected from the hives of native stingless bees in melaleuca forests in the Northern Territory. The Bundjalung people traditionally lived in the area of north-eastern New South Wales where Melaleuca alternifolia is endemic, and they treated skin infections by crushing the leaves of that species over skin infections then covering the area with a warm mudpack.

=== Essential oils ===
Melaleuca alternifolia is notable for its essential oil. Though it is safe for topical applications, tea tree oil is toxic if ingested orally.

The oil is produced on a commercial scale and marketed as tea tree oil. Melaleuca cajuputi is used to produce a similar oil, known as cajuput oil, which is used in Southeast Asia to treat a variety of infections and to add fragrance to food and soaps.

=== Horticulture ===
Melaleucas are popular garden plants, both in Australia and other tropical areas worldwide. The first to be cultivated were grown in England from seed in 1771. Some melaleucas are commonly cultivated, grown as trees for parks and large gardens (such as Melaleuca leucadendra) or as ornamentals (sometimes as Callistemon) such as M. citrina (Callistemon citrinus), M. hypericifolia and M. wilsonii.

=== Melaleucas used in horticulture ===
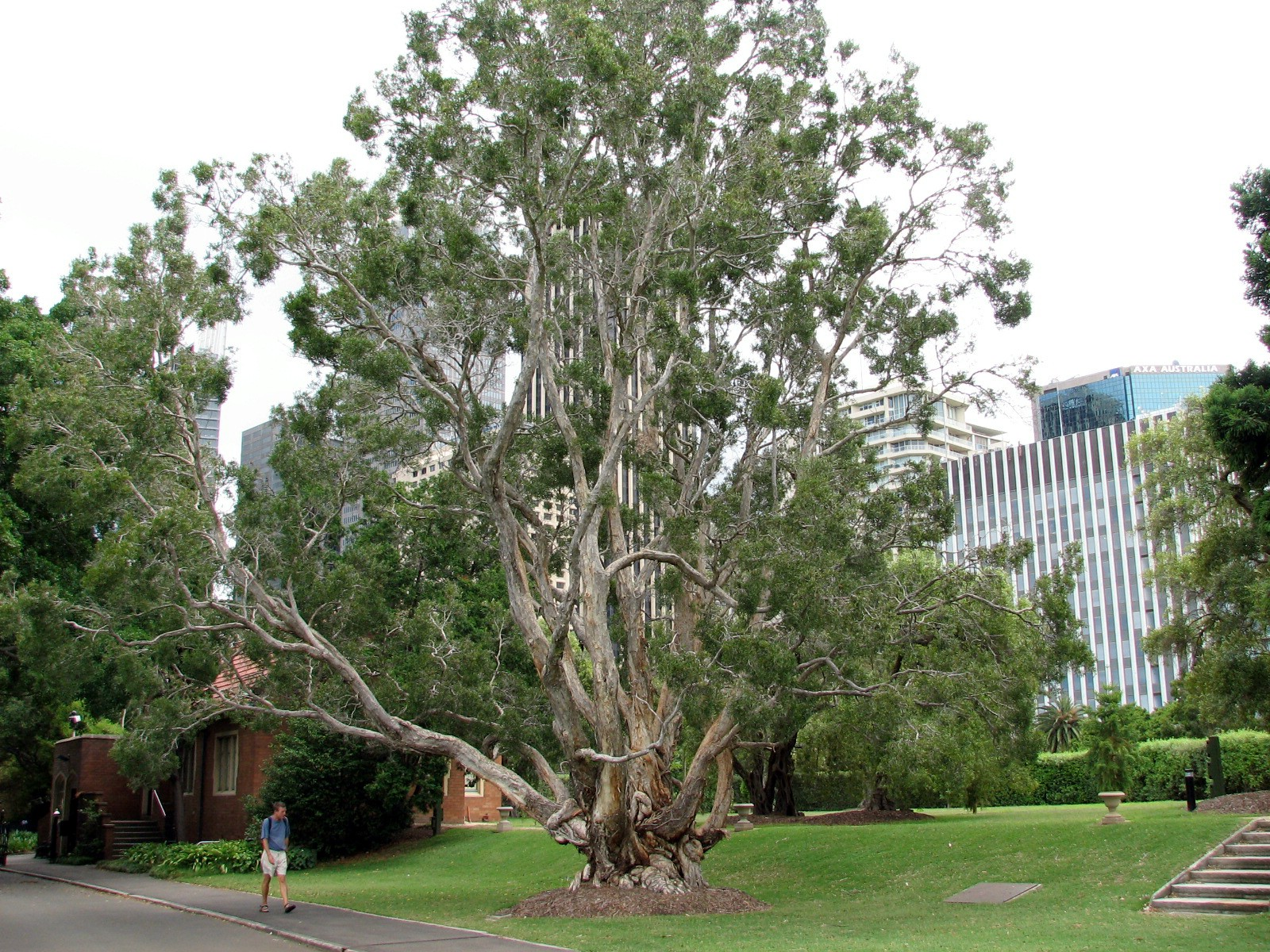
M. leucadendra in the Royal Botanic Gardens, Sydney

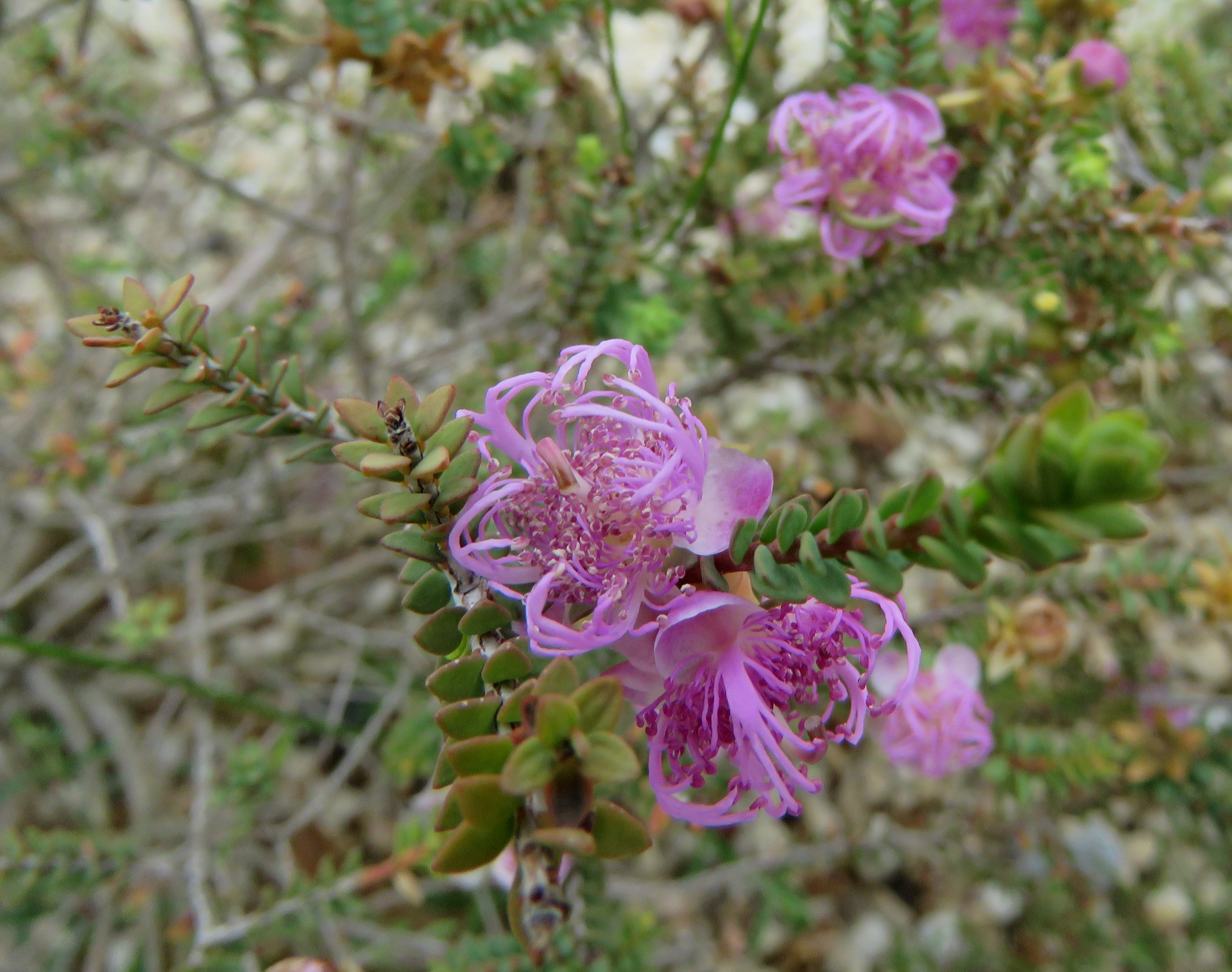
M. pulchella ("claw flower") in Melbourne Botanic Garden

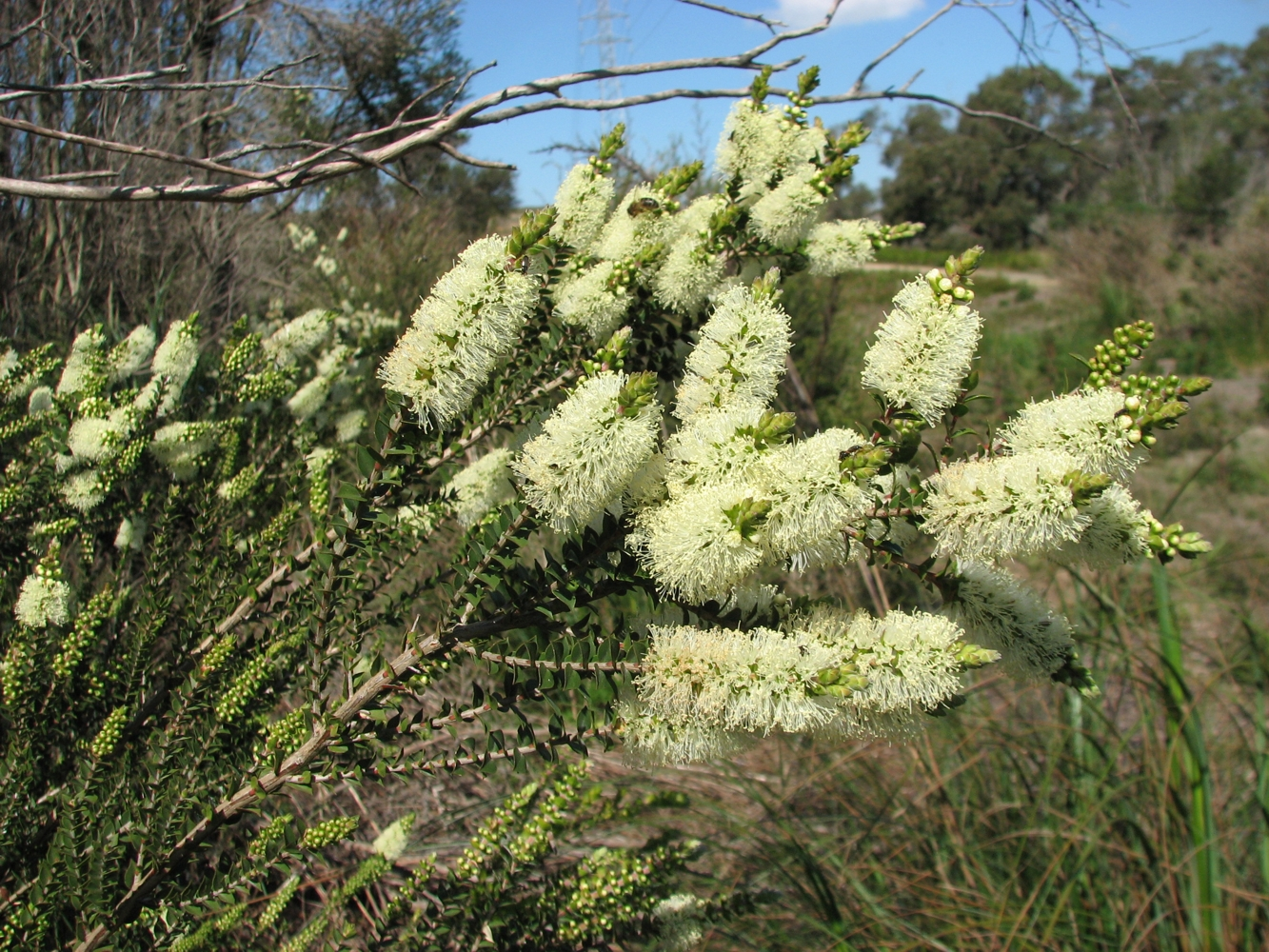
M. squarrosa in Langwarrin Flora and Fauna Reserve

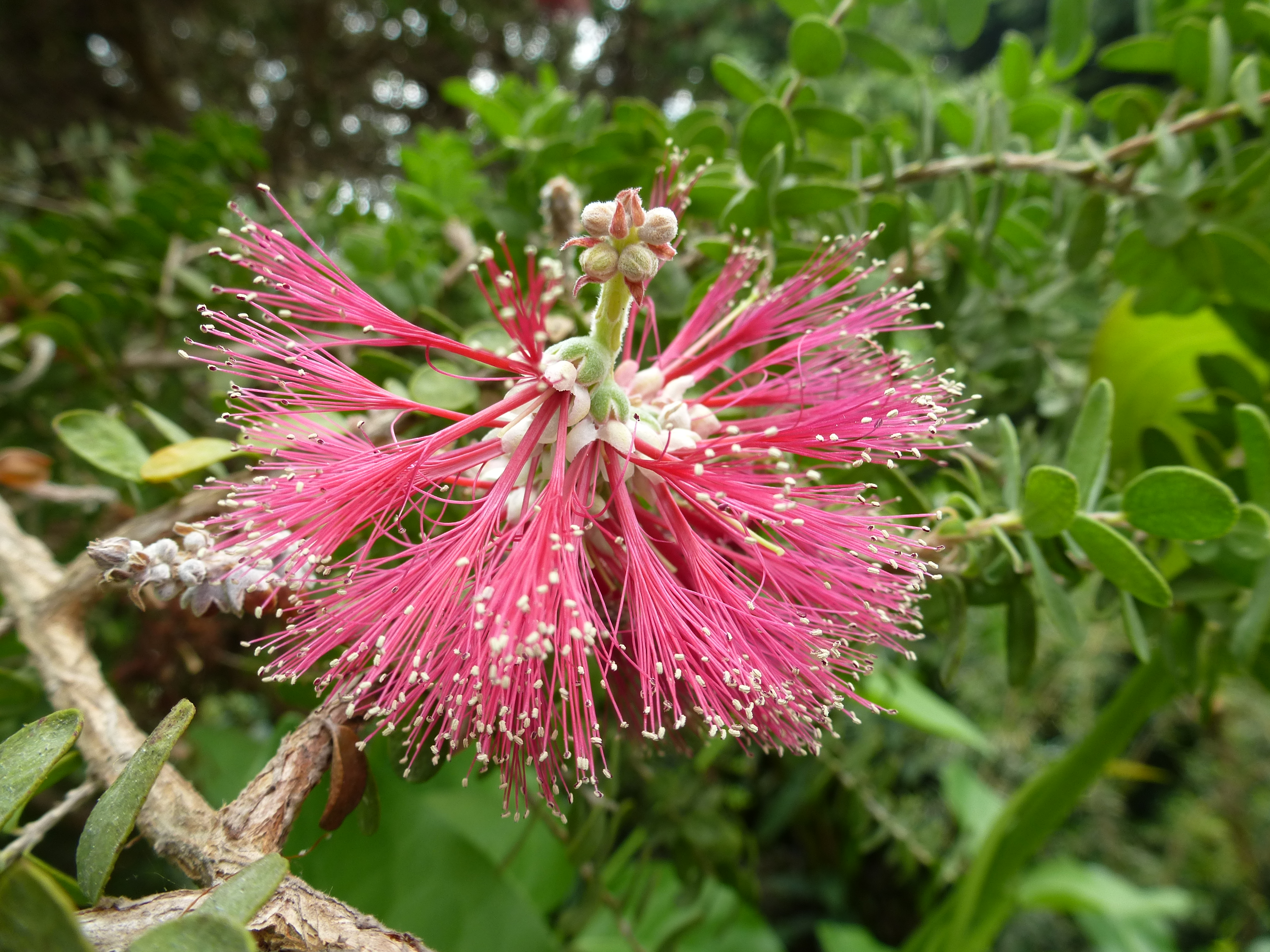
M. elliptica in Edinburgh Botanic Garden

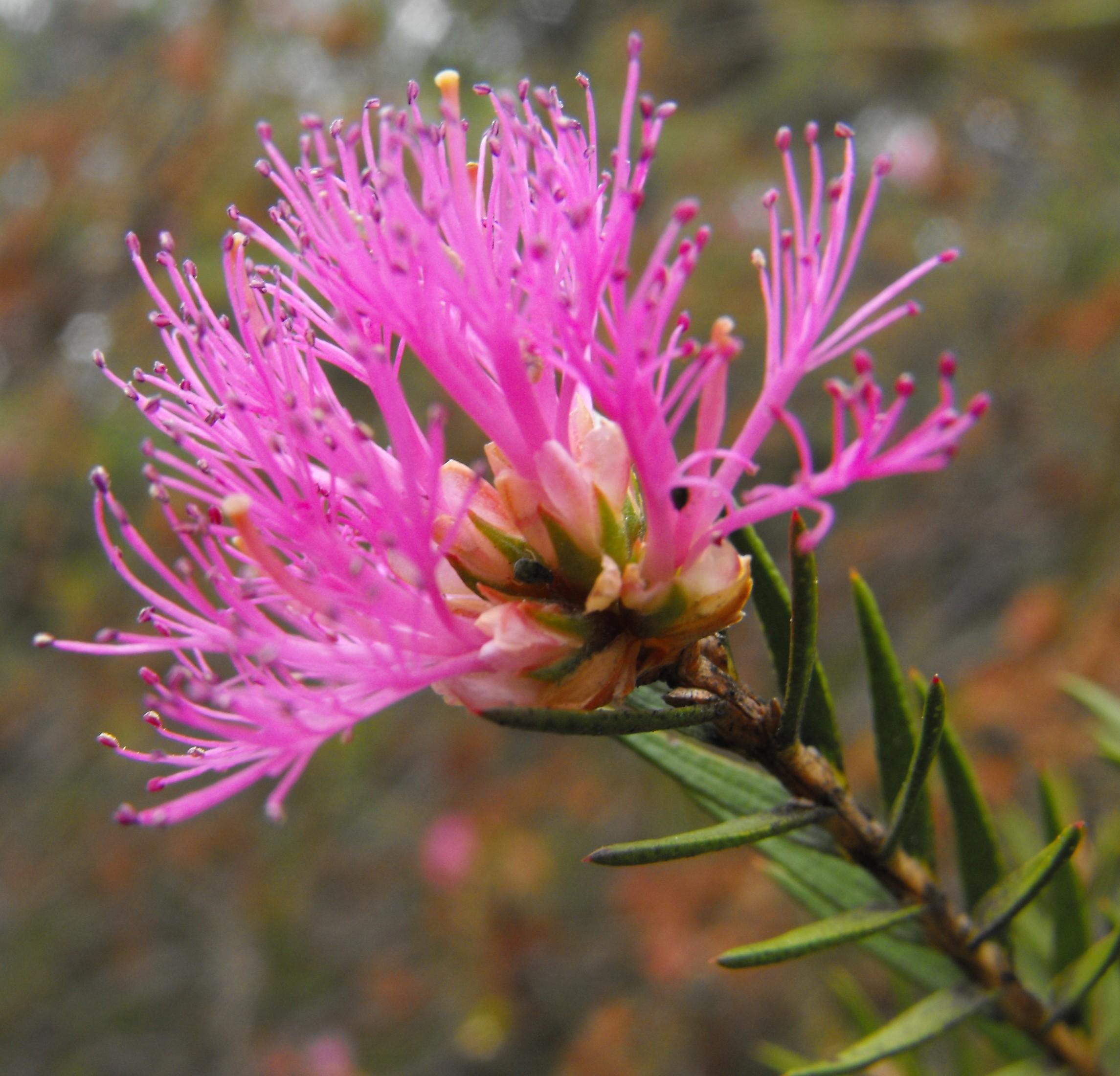
M. wilsonii in San Diego Botanic Garden

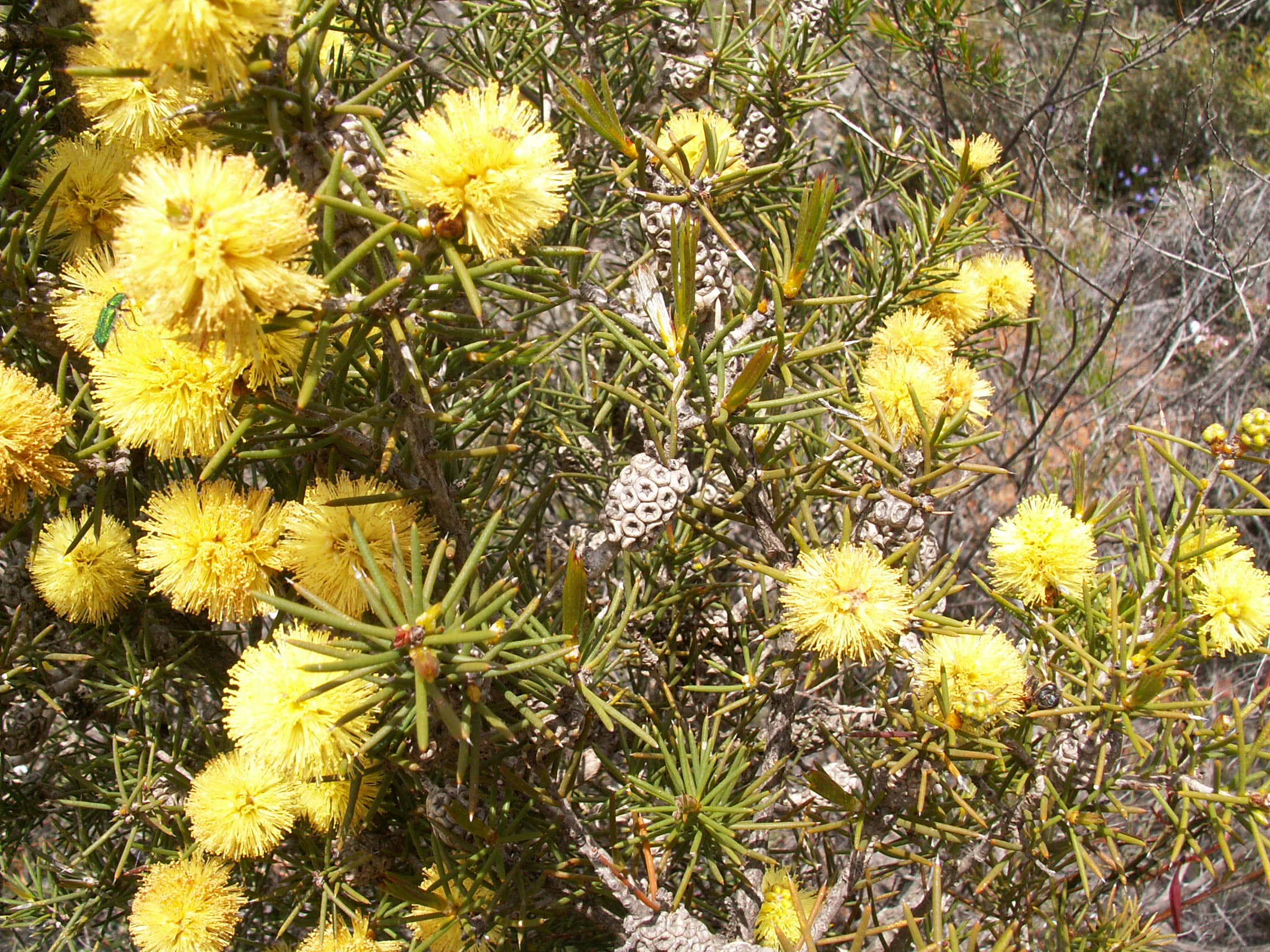
M. pungens useful as a hedge because of its prickly foliage.

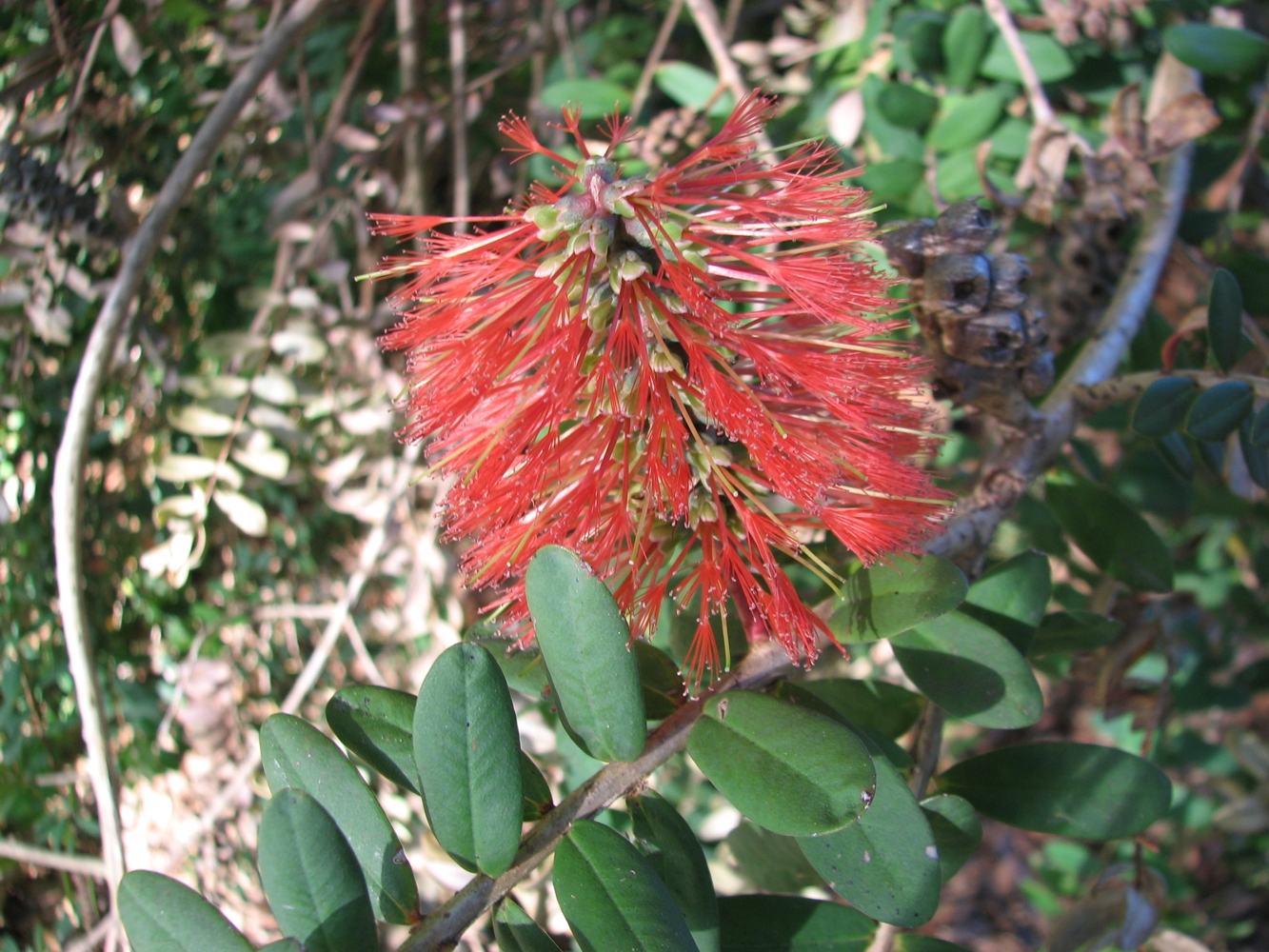
The widely cultivated M. hypericifolia in Arthurs Seat State Park

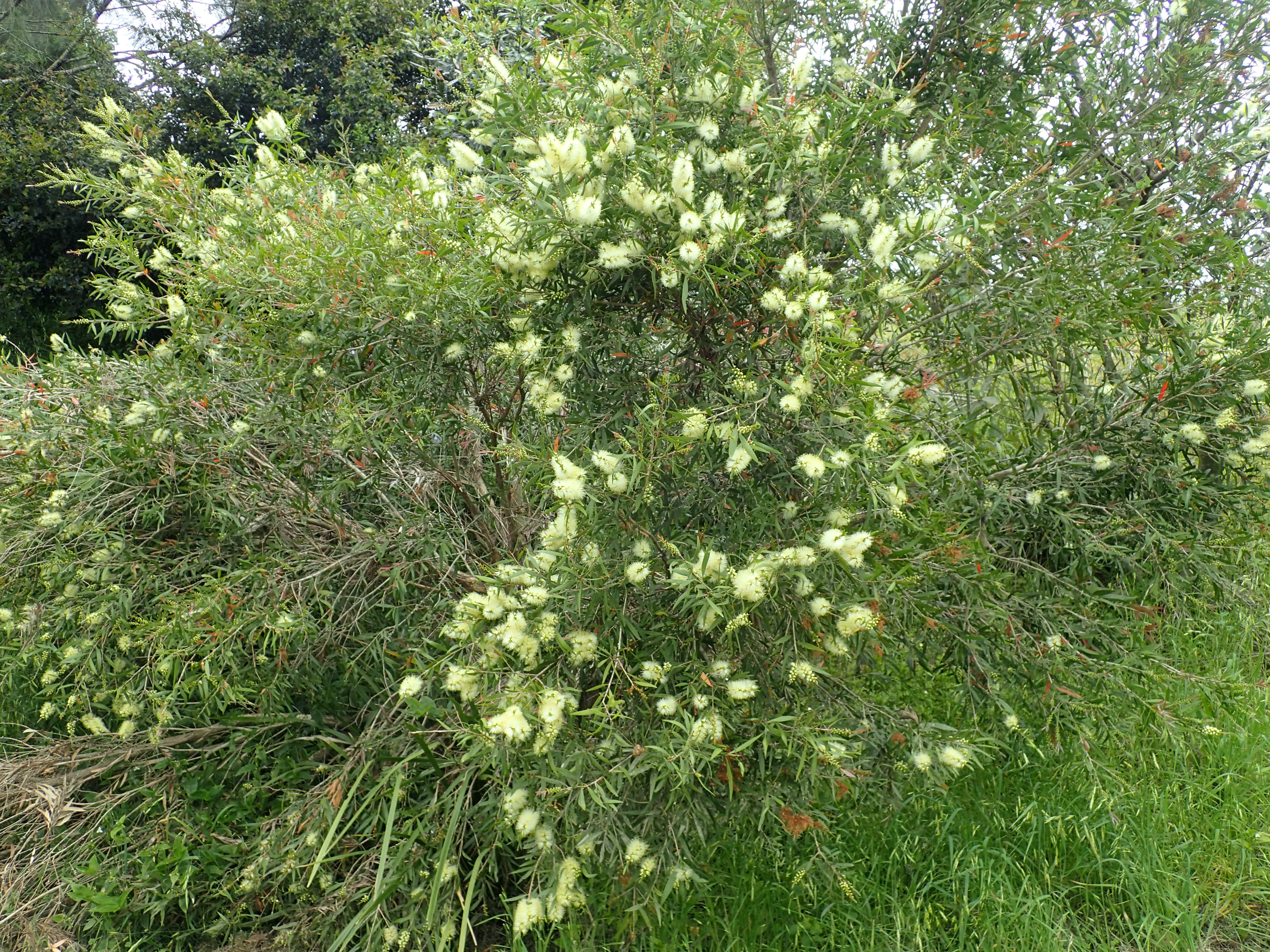
M. salicina – a popular garden shrub

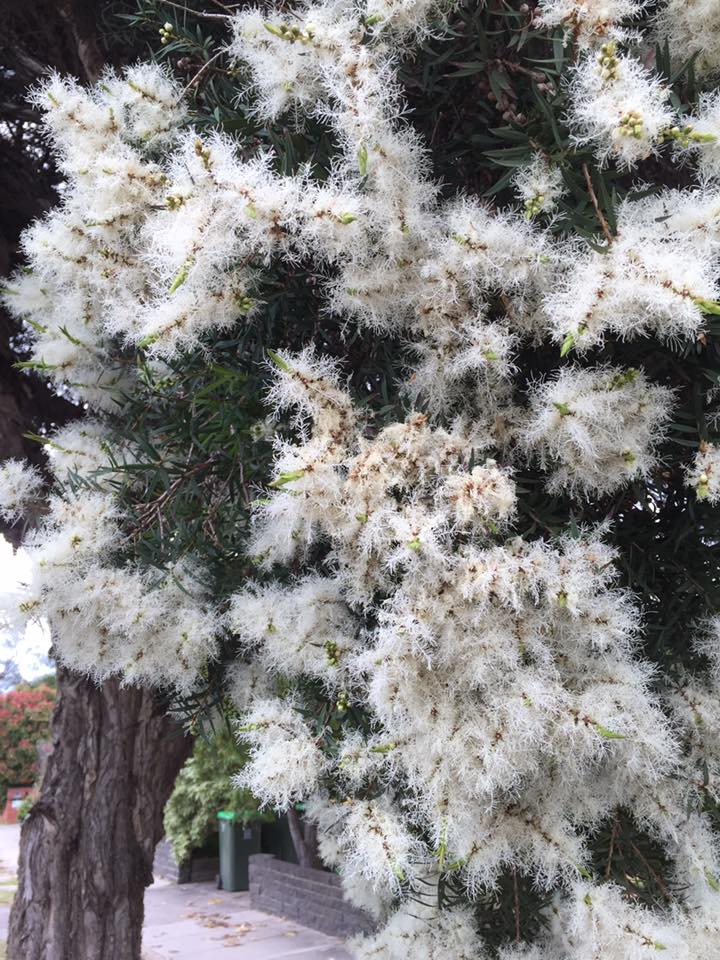
M. linariifolia (snow-in-summer)

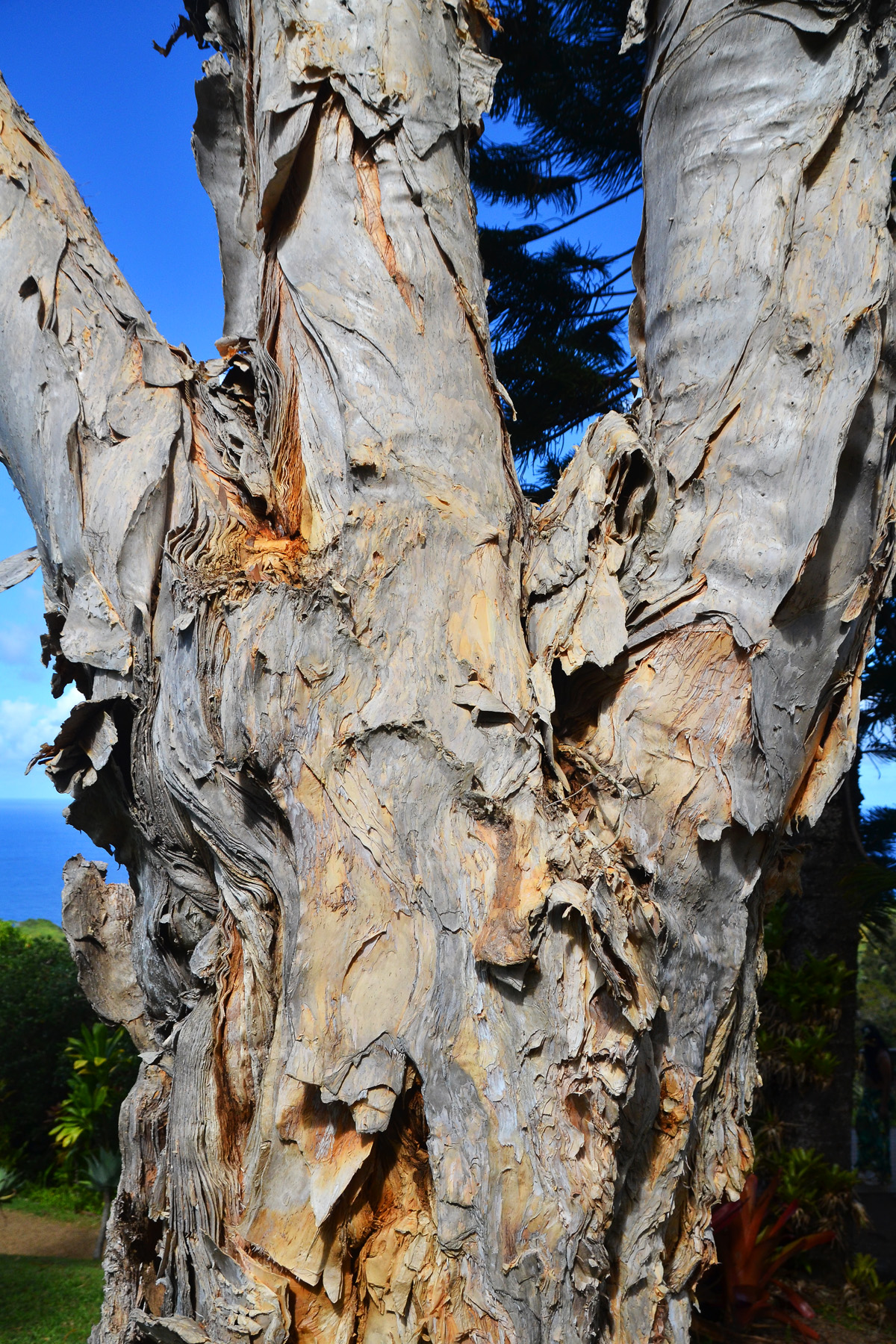
Bark (Hawaii, Maui)

=== In popular culture ===
Tea trees (spelled Ti-Trees) are specifically mentioned in the lyrics of a short aria 'Joy' published around 1916 by J.D.Fletcher & Co of London, by Australian composer Arthur Chanter (1866–1950).

== See also ==
- List of Melaleuca species
