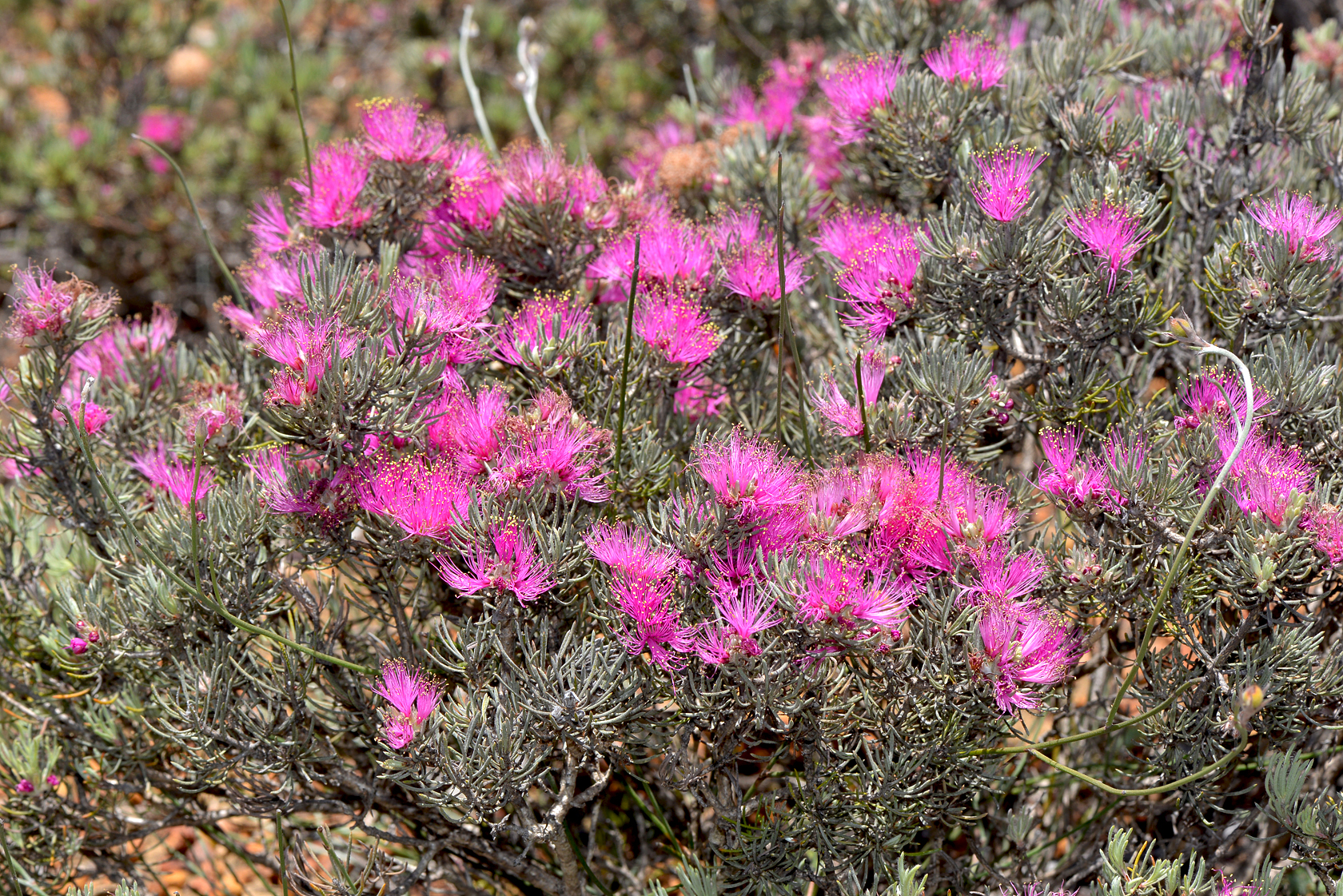
- Near Mundaring

Scientific classification
- Kingdom: Plantae
- Clade: Tracheophytes
- Clade: Angiosperms
- Clade: Eudicots
- Clade: Rosids
- Order: Myrtales
- Family: Myrtaceae
- Genus: Melaleuca
- Species: M. aspalathoides

Binomial name
- Melaleuca aspalathoides Schauer

Synonyms
- Myrtoleucodendron aspalathodes (Schauer) Kuntze

= Melaleuca aspalathoides =

Species of shrub

Melaleuca aspalathoides is a small shrub in the myrtle family, Myrtaceae and is endemic to a small area in the south-west of Western Australia. It is a small shrub with soft, grey foliage and distinctive calyx lobes around each of its magenta-coloured flowers.

== Description ==
Melaleuca aspalathoides usually grows to a height of less than 60 cm (20 in). Its leaves are thin cylinder-shaped, 7–28 mm (0.3–1 in) long, crowded around the stem and covered with silky, grey-green hairs. Leaves on new shoots are longer, softer and silkier than older leaves.

Magenta-coloured flowers appear in late spring and summer at the ends of the branches, contrasting with the grey foliage. The base of the flower is woolly and the five sepals surrounding it are sharply pointed. Flowering occurs in late spring and summer. The fruit are round to urn-shaped, about 7 mm (0.3 in) long and 5 mm (0.2 in) diameter.

== Taxonomy and naming ==
This species was first formally described in 1844 by Johannes Conrad Schauer in Plantae Preissianae from a specimen collected near York in 1840. The specific epithet (aspalathoides) is a reference to its similarity to plants in the genus Aspalathus.

== Distribution and habitat ==
This melaleuca occurs in the area between the Walkaway, Western Australia and Brookton-Tammin districts in the Avon Wheatbelt, Geraldton Sandplains and Jarrah Forest biogeographic regions of Western Australia. It grows in loam on gravelly ridges.

== Conservation status ==
Melaleuca aspalathoides is classified as not threatened by the Government of Western Australia Department of Parks and Wildlife.
