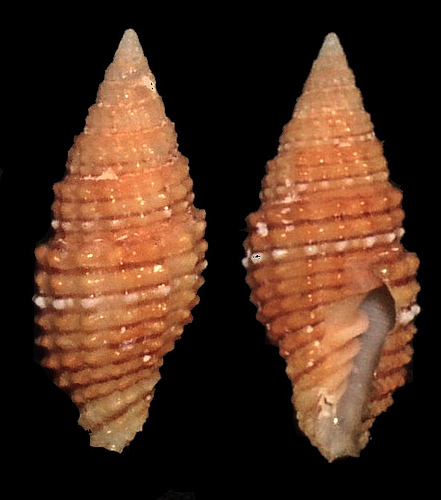
- Vexillum crocatum

Scientific classification
- Kingdom: Animalia
- Phylum: Mollusca
- Class: Gastropoda
- Subclass: Caenogastropoda
- Order: Neogastropoda
- Superfamily: Turbinelloidea
- Family: Costellariidae
- Genus: Vexillum
- Species: V. crocatum

Binomial name
- Vexillum crocatum (Lamarck, 1811)

Synonyms
- Mitra assimilis Garrett, 1873 (uncertain synonym; invalid: junior homonym of Mitra assimilis Pease, 1868); Mitra aurantia Broderip, W.J., 1836 (non Gmelin, 1791); Mitra concinna Reeve, 1844; Mitra crocata Lamarck, 1811 (original combination); Mitra cumingii Reeve, 1844; Mitra flavescens Reeve, L.A., 1844; Mitra imitatrix Dautzenberg, Ph. & J.L. Bouge, 1923; Pusia crocata (Lamarck, 1811); Pusia imitatrix (P. Dautzenberg & J.L. Bouge, 1923); Vexillum (Pusia) crocatum (Lamarck, 1811); Vexillum cumingi (Reeve, 1844)

= Vexillum crocatum =

Species of gastropod

Vexillum crocatum, common name : the saffron mitre, is a species of small sea snail, marine gastropod mollusk in the family Costellariidae, the ribbed miters.

== Description ==
The shell size varies between 17 mm and 36 mm.

(Described as Mitra concinna) The ovate shell is contracted at the base. The spire is turreted. The whorls are angulated at the upper part and longitudinally ribbed. The ribs are granosely pointed upon the angle, transversely crossed with small obtuse ridges. The ridges are bright yellow, the interstices very dark chesnut. The columella is four-plaited.

(Original description as Mitra assimilis) The oblong shell is subfusiform, turreted, solid and shining. It is whitish, with closely set transverse deep-brown slightly raised lines. The spire is moderately elevated and acute. The shell contains 8-9 whorls, plano-convex, shouldered above, longitudinally ribbed. The ribs are closely set, angular, slightly nodulous, 16 to 18 in number. The body whorl is convexly rounded, contracted and granulated at the base. The aperture is narrow, bluish white and lyrate within. The outer lip is rather sharp and crenulate. The columella shows four folds.

== Distribution ==
This species occurs in the Red Sea, in the Indian Ocean off Chagos and the Mascarene Basin, and in the Indo-West Pacific.
