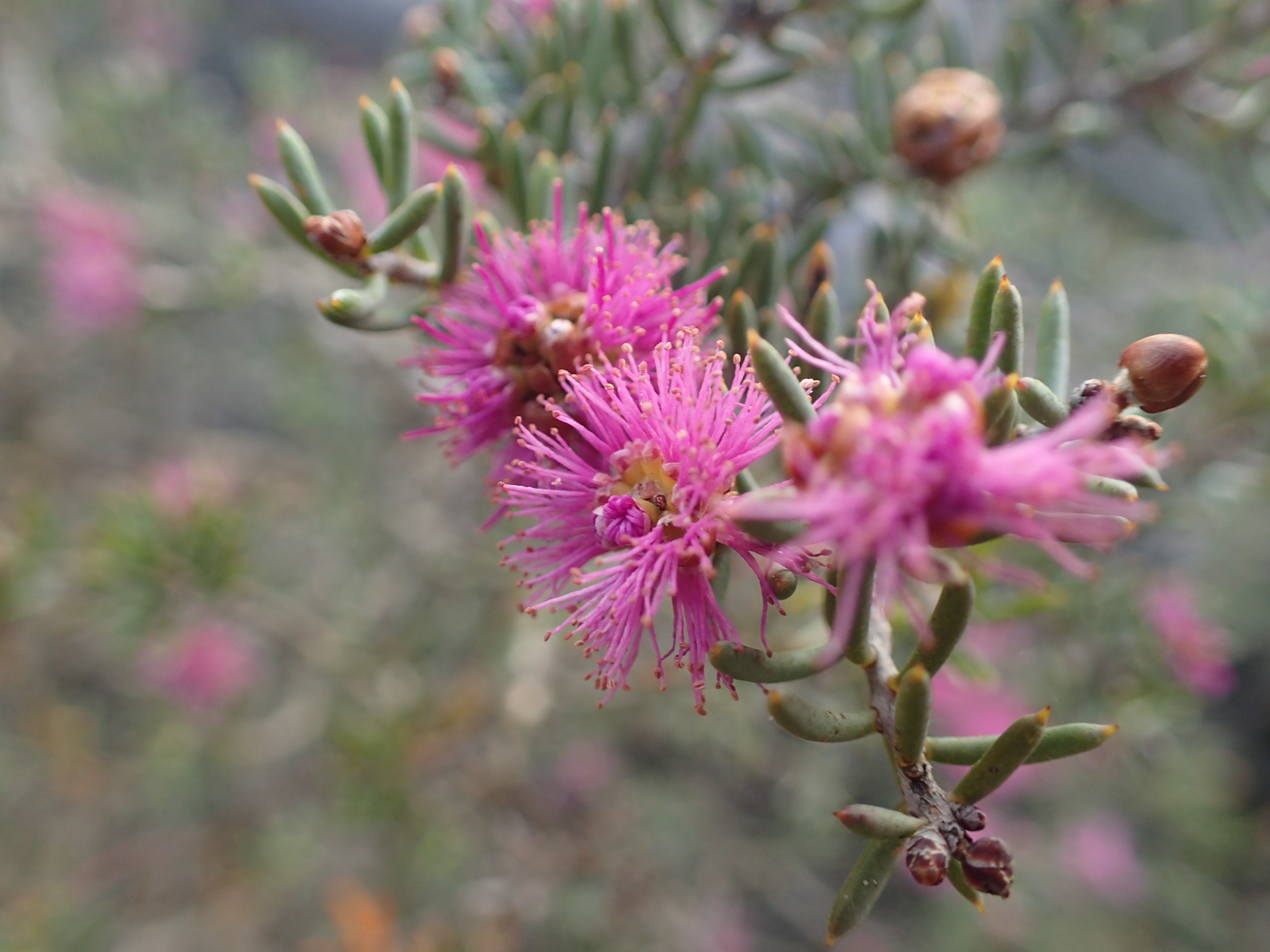

Scientific classification
- Kingdom: Plantae
- Clade: Tracheophytes
- Clade: Angiosperms
- Clade: Eudicots
- Clade: Rosids
- Order: Myrtales
- Family: Myrtaceae
- Genus: Melaleuca
- Species: M. concinna

Binomial name
- Melaleuca concinna Turcz.

= Melaleuca concinna =

Species of shrub

Melaleuca concinna is a small shrub in the myrtle family Myrtaceae and is endemic to the south-west of Western Australia. Its species name translates as "neat" or "pretty" and it is distinguished by having many heads of pink flowers in late spring followed by spherical clusters of woody fruits.

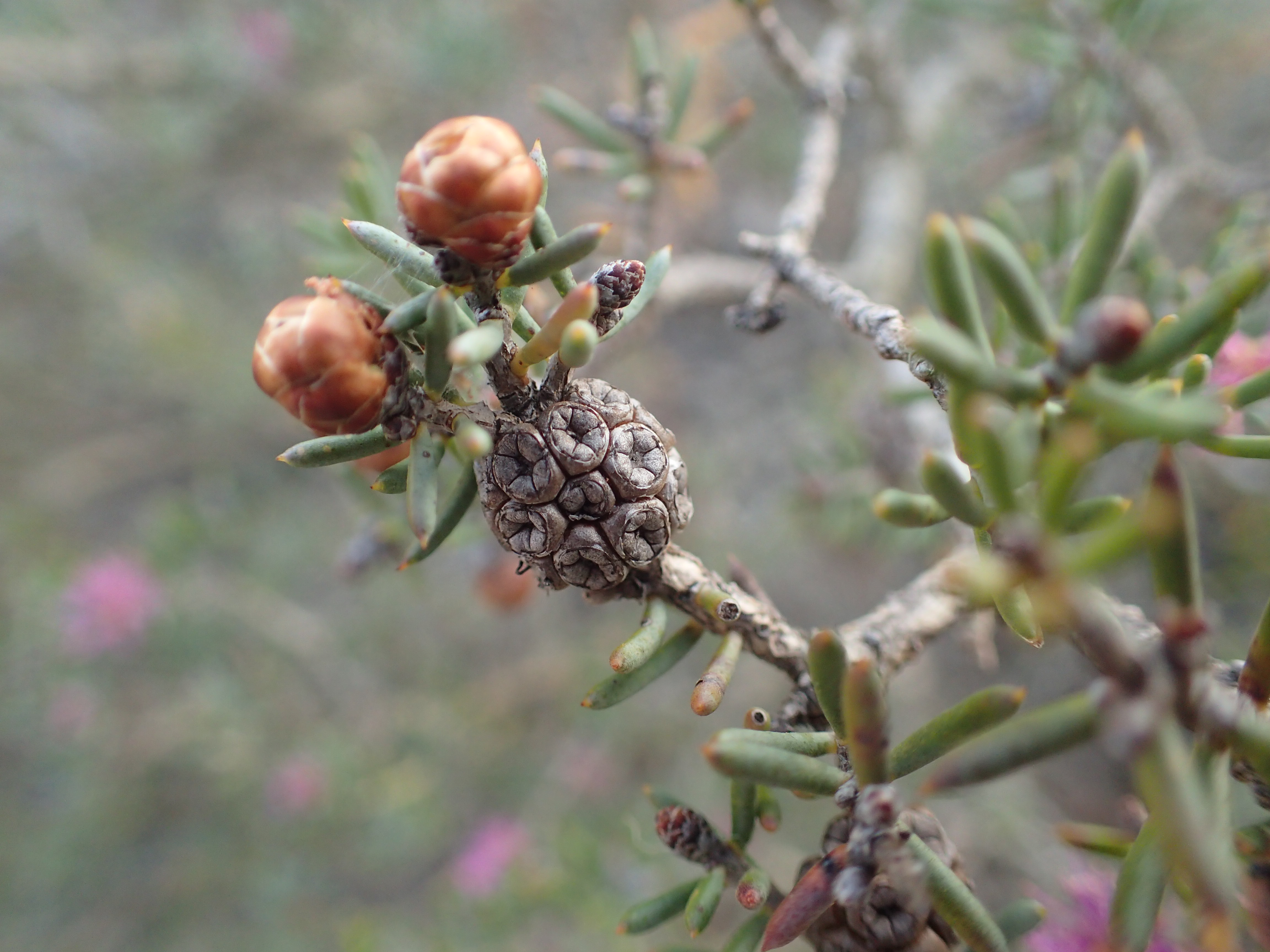
fruit

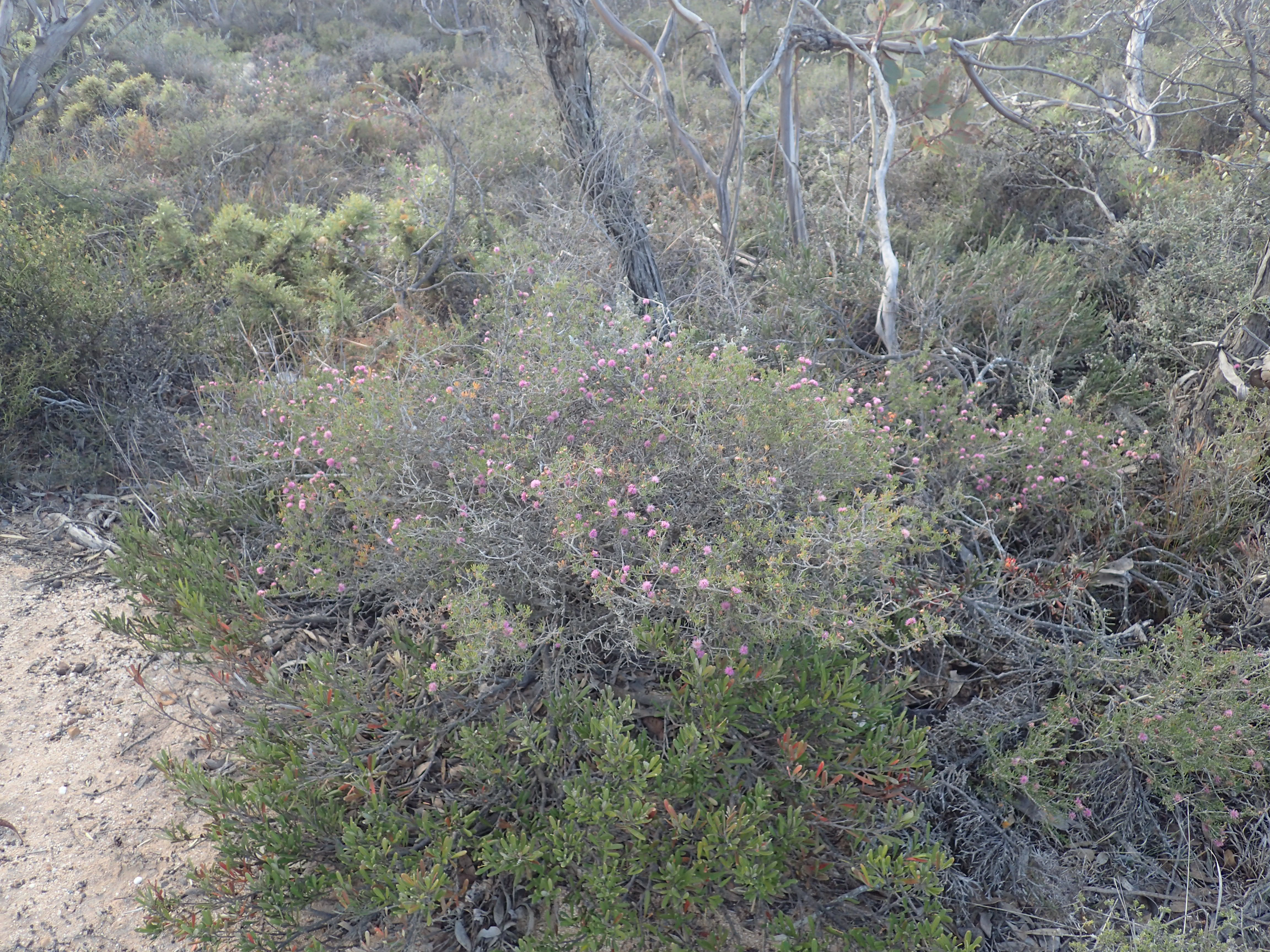
Habit near Ravensthorpe

== Description ==
Melaleuca concinna is prickly, spreading shrub to about 1.5 m (5 ft) high. The leaves are arranged alternately, 3.5–13 mm (0.1–0.5 in) long and 1.0–1.8 mm (0.04–0.07 in) wide, almost circular in cross section, with a short stalk (less than 1 mm (0.04 in) long) and a sharp pointed end.

The flowers are arranged in heads, at or near the ends of the branches which continue to grow after flowering. Each head is up to 17 mm (0.7 in) in diameter and contains between 4 and 9 groups of flowers, each group with 3 individual flowers. The base of the flowers is surrounded by white bracts. The petals are 0.8–1.5 mm (0.03–0.06 in) long and fall off as the flower opens. The flowers are surrounded by five bundles of stamens, each bundle containing 3 to 5 pink or purple stamens. The main flowering period is in October and November and is followed by almost spherical clusters of fruit about 7 mm (0.3 in) in diameter.

== Taxonomy and naming ==
This species was first formally described in 1852 by the Russian botanist Nikolai Turczaninow in Bulletin de la Société Impériale des Naturalistes de Moscou under the heading Myrtaceae Xerocarpicae in Nova Hollandi. The specific epithet (concinna) is from the Latin concinnus meaning "neat", "pretty", or "elegant".

== Distribution and habitat ==
This melaleuca occurs in the south Stirling Range, Jerramungup and Ravensthorpe districts in the Esperance Plains and Mallee biogeographic regions growing in sandy loam over clay or laterite in mallee scrub or heath and along railway lines.

== Conservation status ==
Melaleuca concinna is listed as not threatened by the Government of Western Australia Department of Parks and Wildlife.

== Use in horticulture ==
This species is not often cultivated but has been grown successfully in Adelaide.
