= San Diego Botanic Garden =

Botanical garden in Encinitas, California

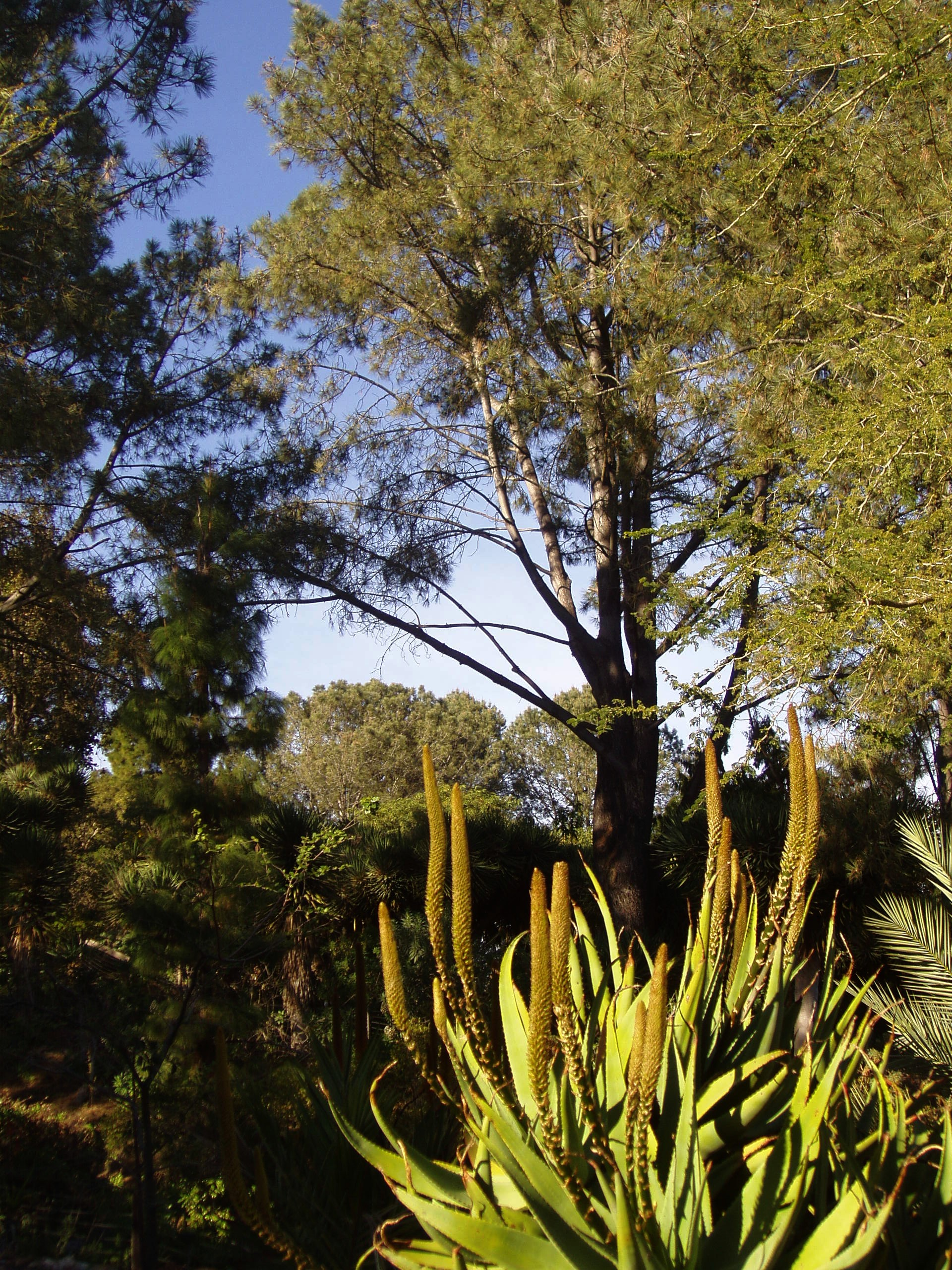
- General view of the garden

- Location within California Location within the United States
- Type: Botanical garden
- Location: Encinitas, California, United States
- Coordinates: 33.0522°N 117.2806°W
- Area: 37 acres (150,000 m^{2})
- Website: sdbg.org

San Diego Botanic Garden (SDBG) is a botanical garden in Encinitas, California. It displays more than 5,000 plant species and varieties and has 15 gardens that represent different regions of the world, 12 demonstration gardens, and the largest public bamboo collection in North America. The garden sits on 37 acres (15 ha) of land.

Until 1957, the gardens were the private estate of Ruth Baird Larabee, at which time she donated her house and grounds to the County of San Diego. The Quail Botanical Gardens Foundation was established in 1961. In March 1970, it opened as Quail Botanic Gardens. In 2009, the name was changed to San Diego Botanic Garden.

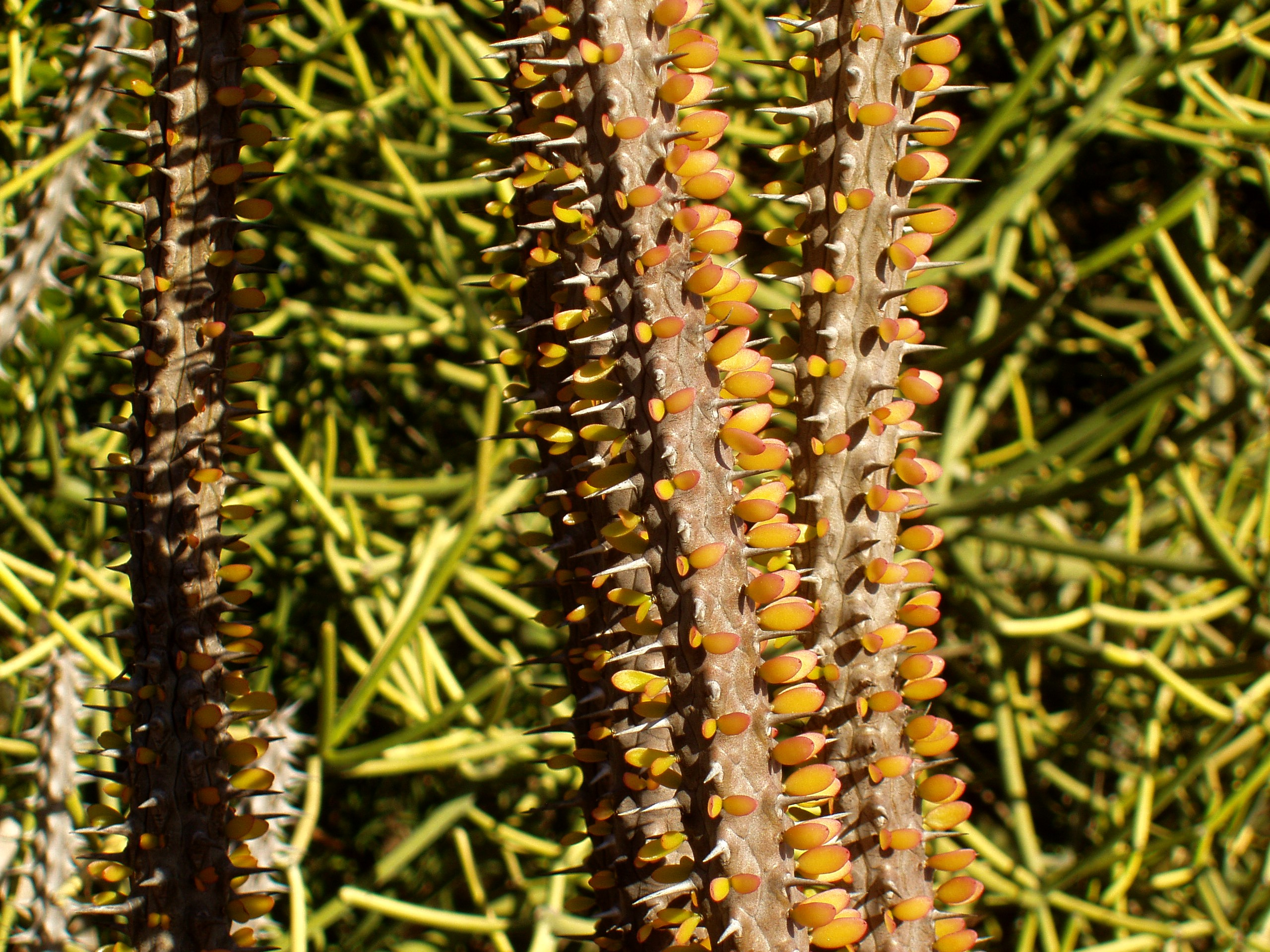
Thorny detail.

== Selected plants ==
Plant varieties include fuchsias, hibiscus, bamboos, proteas, cacti and succulents, as well as other drought-resistant plants including Australian shrubs. Herbs, water plants, wildflowers, perennials, brugmansias, cork oaks, and palms are also featured.

One such plant is the corpse flower, which bloomed in July 2023, for the first time in two years. The plant stands at around four feet tall, and in order to see it, guests must reserve a viewing time in advance, as it is only in bloom for a few days. One identifying feature of a corpse flower is its strong smell, which has been compared to rotting flesh. The flowers are classified as endangered, and botanic gardens around the United States are working to preserve them.

Of particular interest is the maturing cork oak (Quercus suber) forest. Paths wind through a cluster of twisted and majestic Cork Oaks. Cork Oaks groves in other parts of the world are still harvested for their cork (bark) that is used in for corks placed in wine bottles, as well as for purses, jewelry and wallets.

== Gallery ==
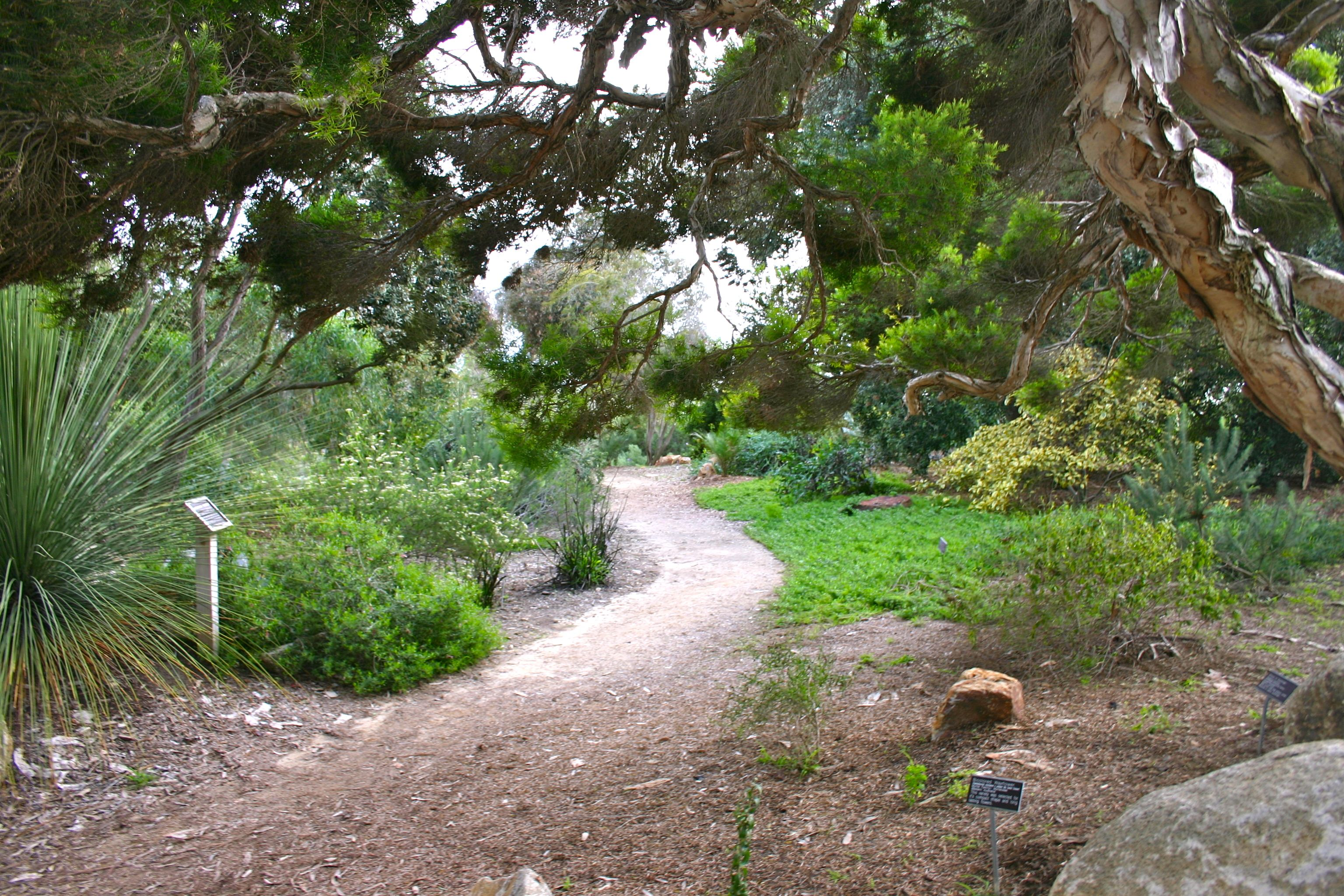
Path through gardens

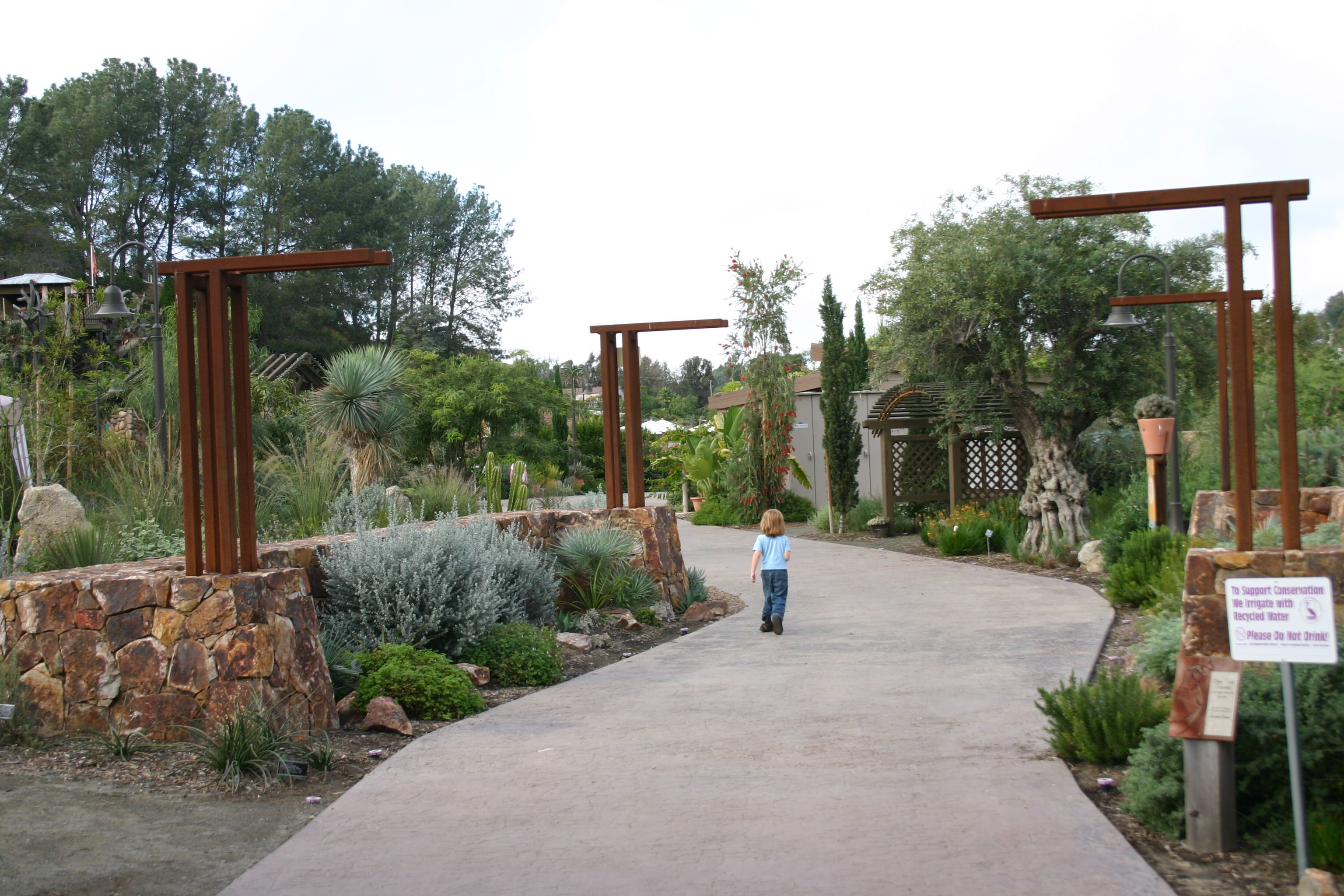
Entrance to Hamilton Children's Garden

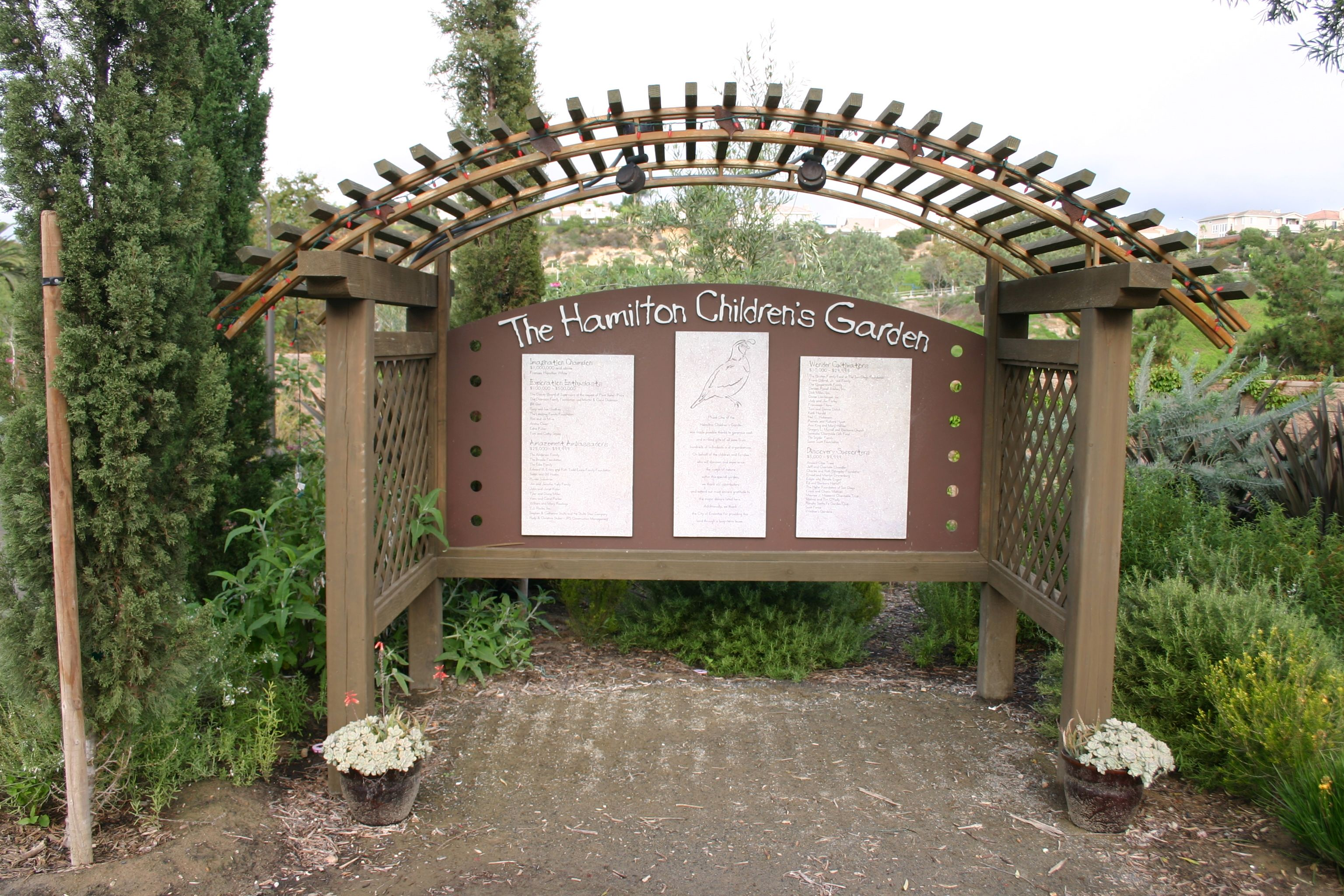
Signboard for Hamilton Children's Garden

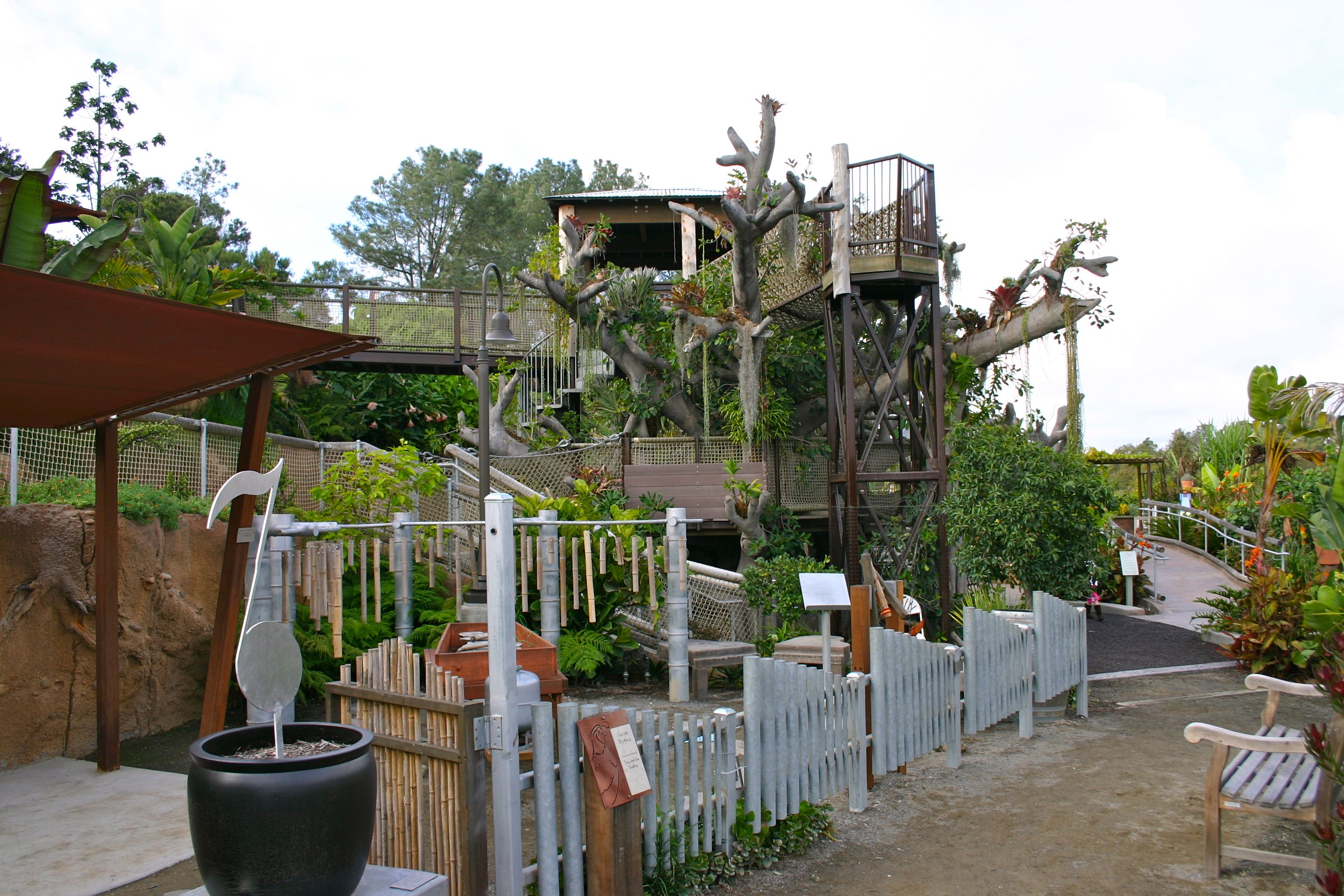
In the Hamilton Children's Garden

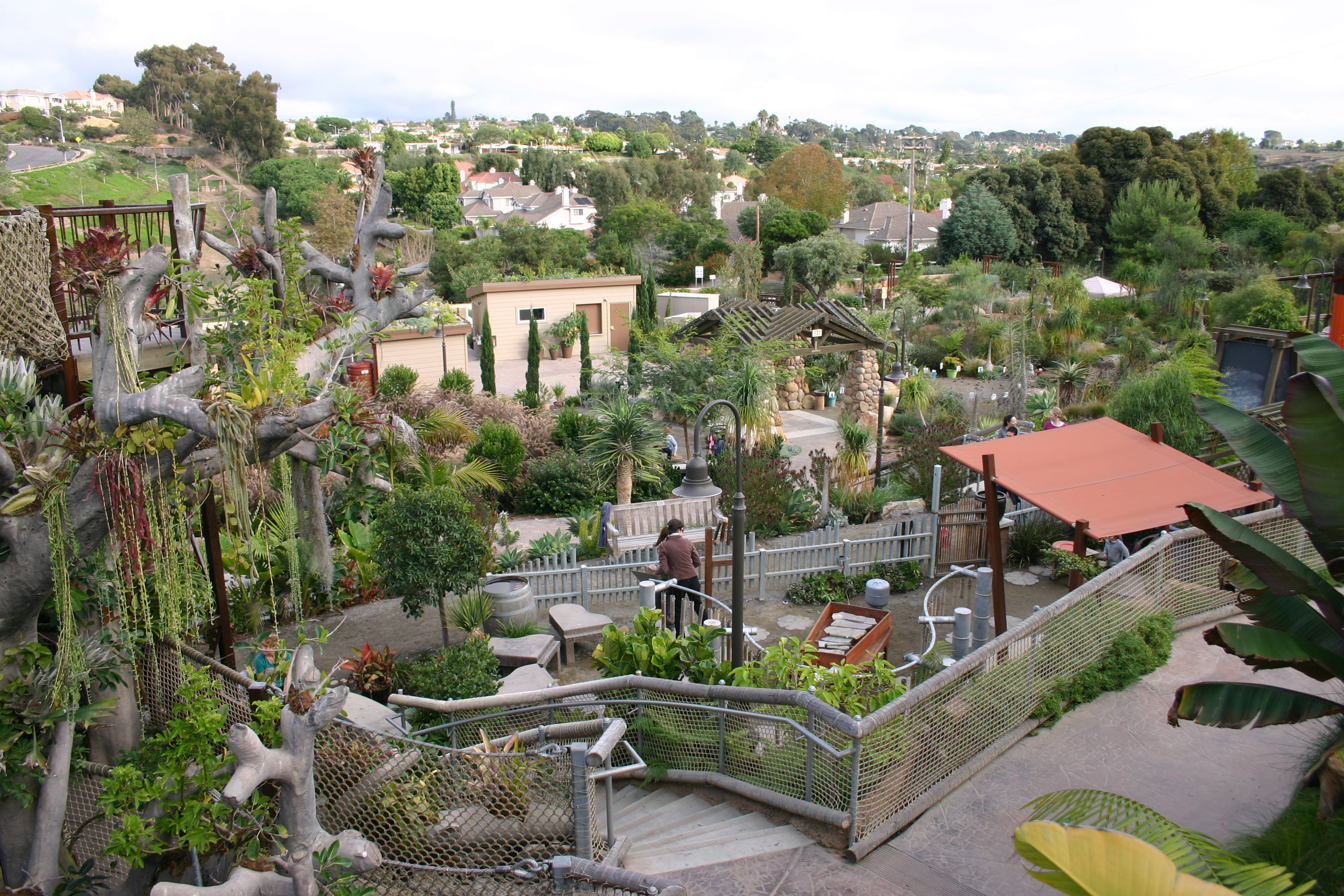
In the Hamilton Children's Garden

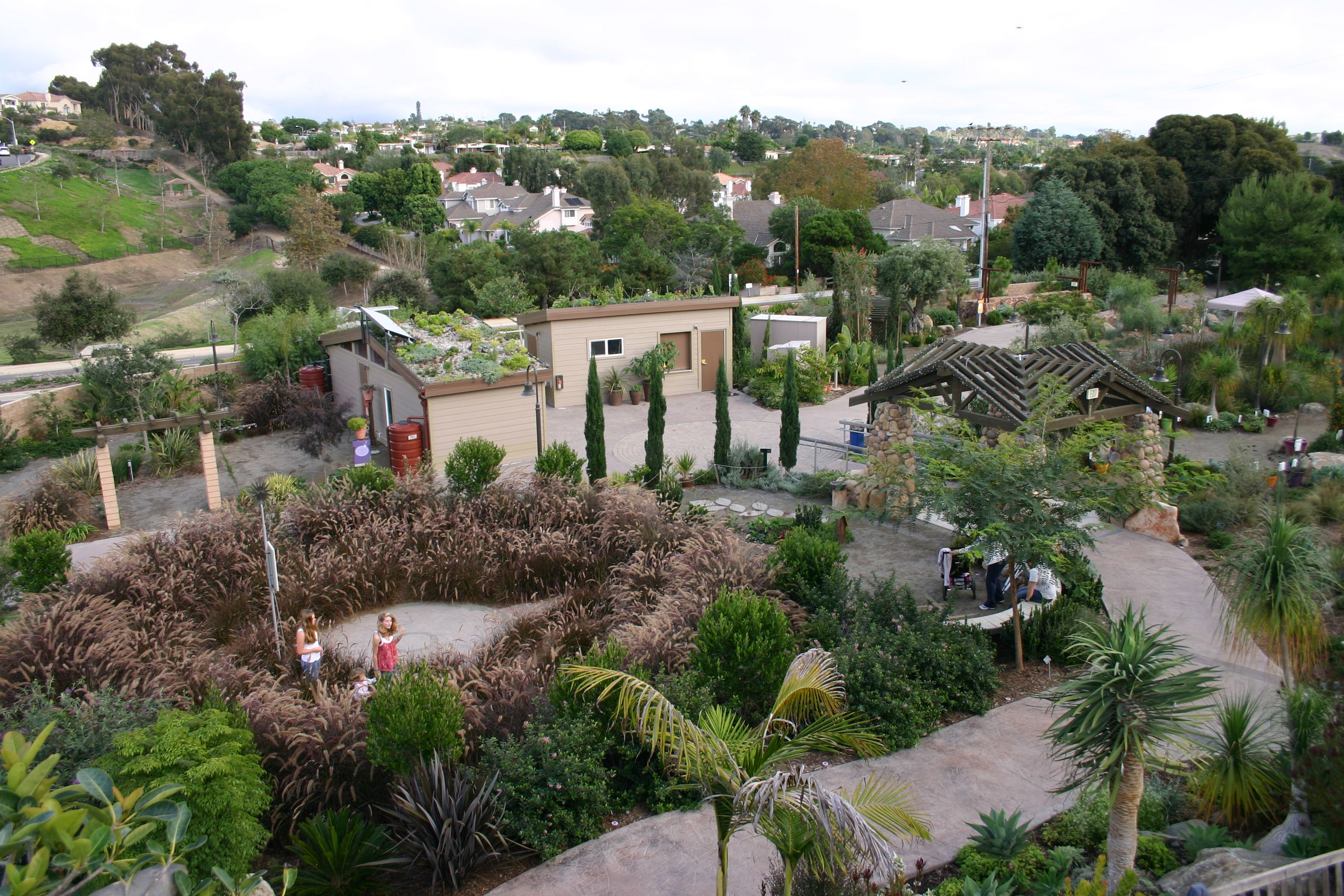
In the Hamilton Children's Garden

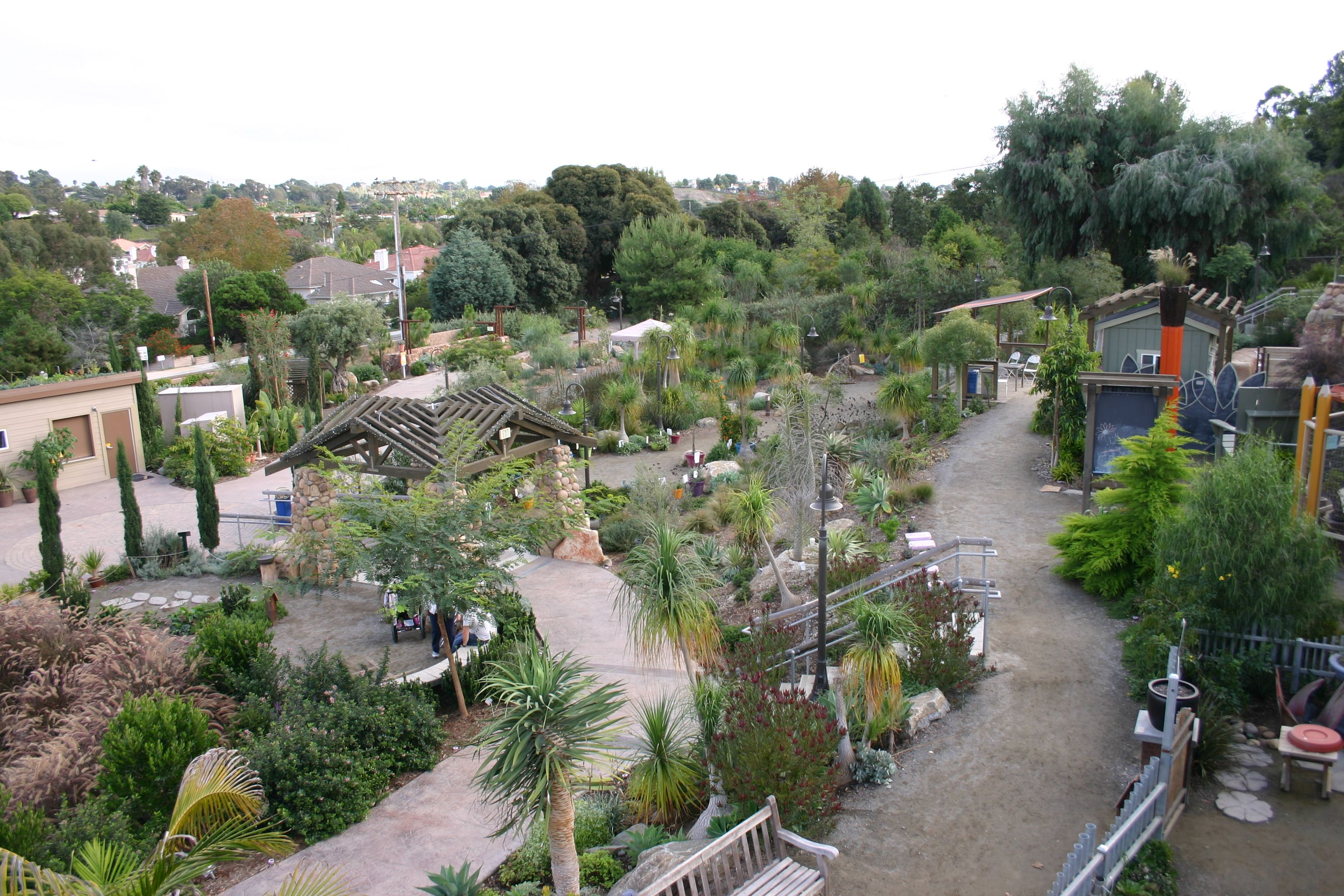
In the Hamilton Children's Garden

== See also ==
- List of botanical gardens in the United States
- California native plants
