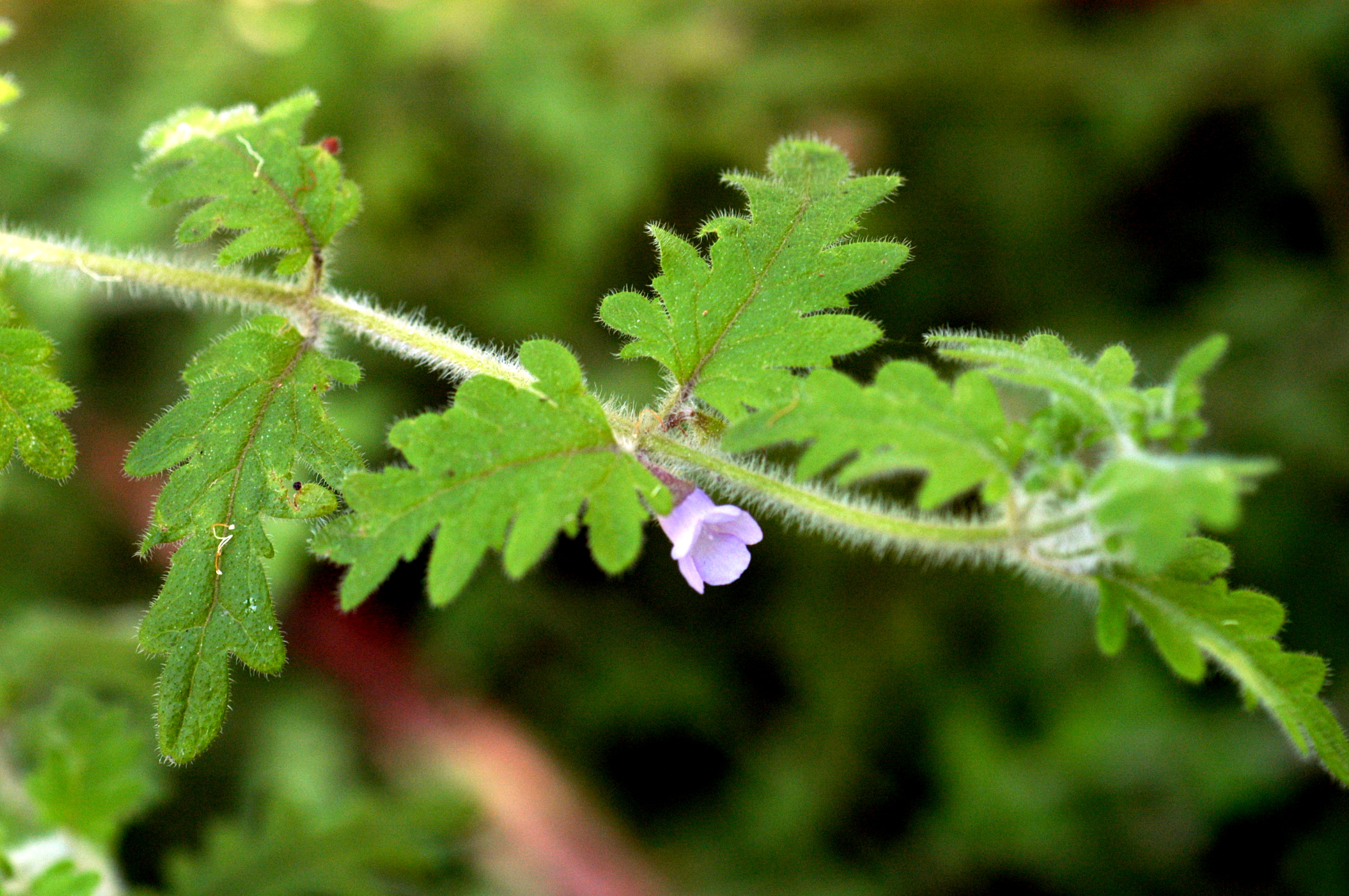
- In Bouddi National Park

Conservation status
- Endangered (EPBC Act)

Scientific classification
- Kingdom: Plantae
- Clade: Tracheophytes
- Clade: Angiosperms
- Clade: Eudicots
- Clade: Asterids
- Order: Lamiales
- Family: Lamiaceae
- Genus: Prostanthera
- Species: P. askania

Binomial name
- Prostanthera askania B.J.Conn
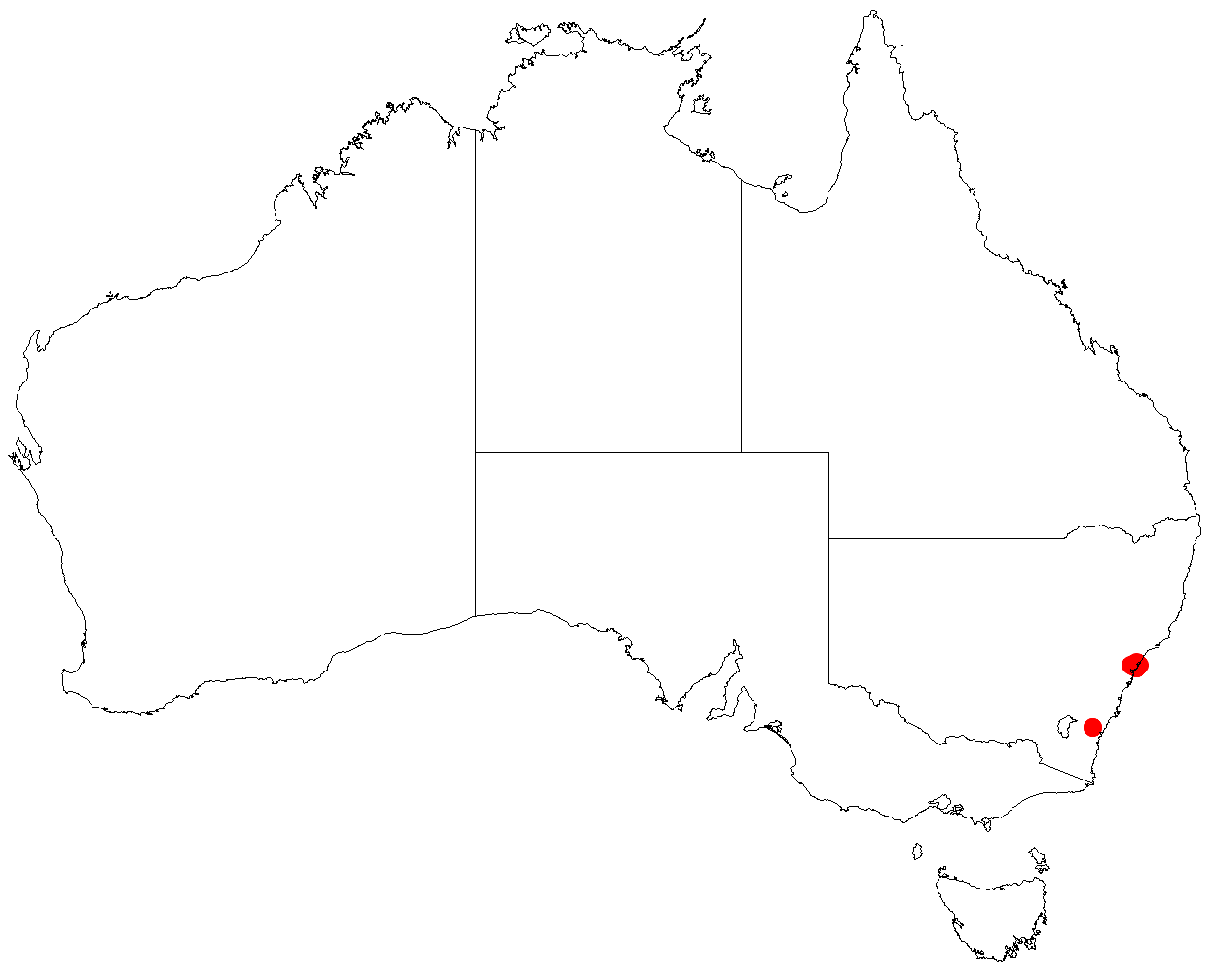
- Occurrence data from AVH

= Prostanthera askania =

Tranquility mintbush

Species of shrub

Prostanthera askania, commonly known as tranquility mintbush, is a shrub that is endemic to Australia. It has mostly pale mauve flowers, strongly scented leaves and branches, dull green, toothed egg-shaped leaves and a restricted distribution.

== Description ==
Prostanthera askania is a small, upright, spreading shrub to 1–2.5 m (3–8 ft) high and similar diameter. The strongly aromatic dull green leaves are egg-shaped, paler on the underside, covered with long spreading hairs 12–40 mm (0.47–1.57 in) long and 8–24 mm (0.31–0.94 in) wide and rounded at the apex. The edges have forward facing teeth 5–10 mm (0.20–0.39 in) long and leaves either squared at the base or gradually narrows to the 2–6 mm (0.079–0.236 in) long hairy petiole. The bracts are 2.5–3 mm (0.098–0.118 in) long and remain after flowering. The dull green bracts 5–6 mm (0.20–0.24 in) long, the tube 1.5–2.5 mm (0.059–0.098 in) long and the lobes 1.8–3.5 mm (0.071–0.138 in) long. The 4-10 light mauve or bluish flowers appear in leafy clusters at the end of branches, petals 12–14 mm (0.47–0.55 in) long. Flowering occurs from June to December.

== Taxonomy and naming ==
Prostanthera askania was first formally described in 1997 by Barry Conn and the description was published in Telopea. The specific epithet askania is named after Askania Park a private reserve west of Ourimbah, where it grows in sheltered gullies.

== Distribution and habitat ==
Tranquility mint bush has a restricted distribution near creeks that flow into Brisbane Water or Tuggerah Lake near Gosford in New South Wales. It grows as an understory shrub near rainforest on flats to reasonably steep slopes in sandstone and alluvial soils.

== Conservation status ==
Prostanthera askania is listed as "endangered" under the Australian Government Environment Protection and Biodiversity Conservation Act 1999 and the New South Wales Government Biodiversity Conservation Act 2016.
