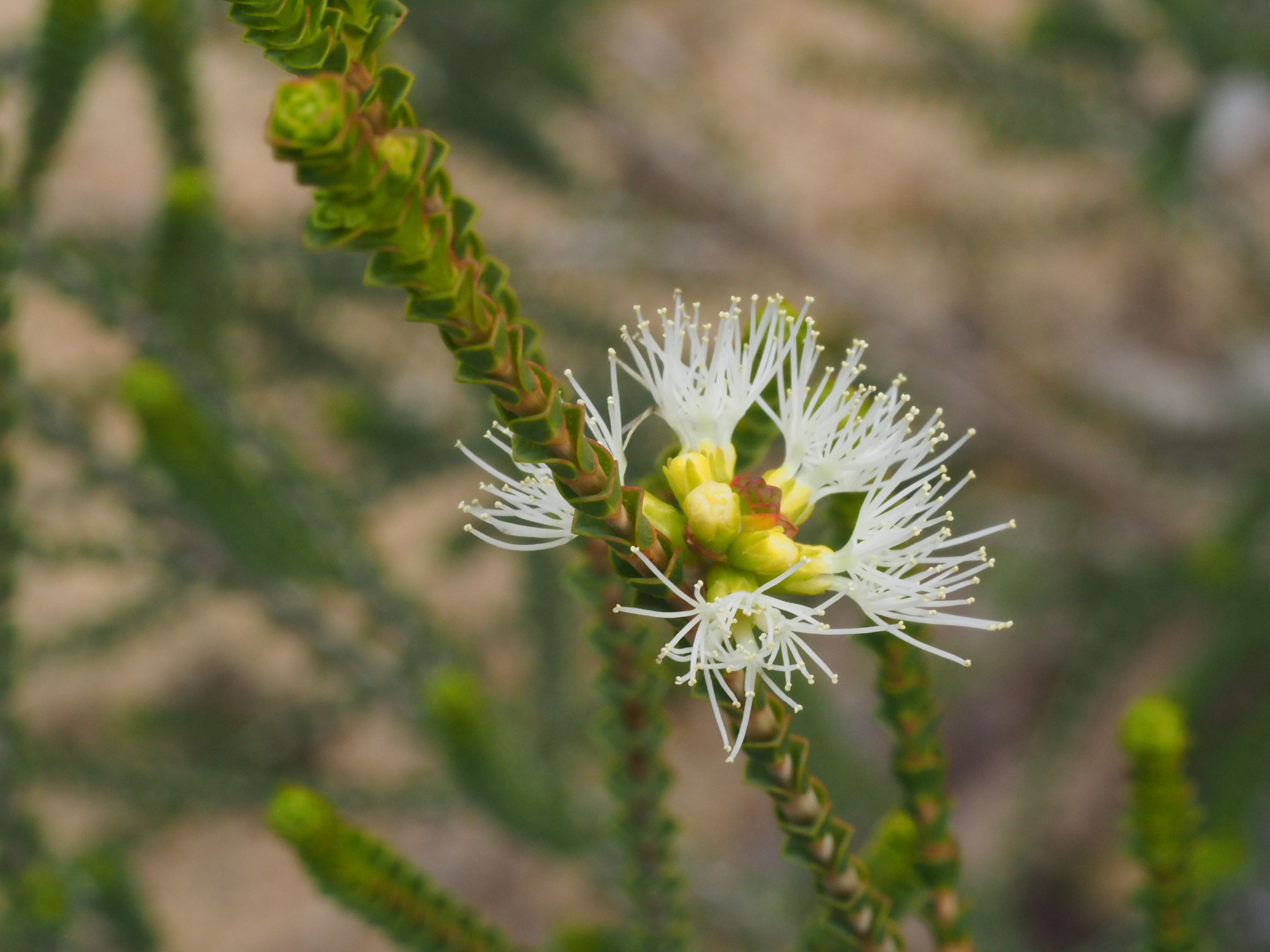
- Foliage and flowers in Kings Park, Perth

Scientific classification
- Kingdom: Plantae
- Clade: Tracheophytes
- Clade: Angiosperms
- Clade: Eudicots
- Clade: Rosids
- Order: Myrtales
- Family: Myrtaceae
- Genus: Beaufortia
- Species: B. sprengelioides

Binomial name
- Beaufortia sprengelioides (DC.) Craven

Synonyms
- Beaufortia dampieri A.Cunn.; Melaleuca sprengelioides DC.; Schizopleura dampieri (A.Cunn.) Walp.

= Beaufortia sprengelioides =

Species of flowering plant

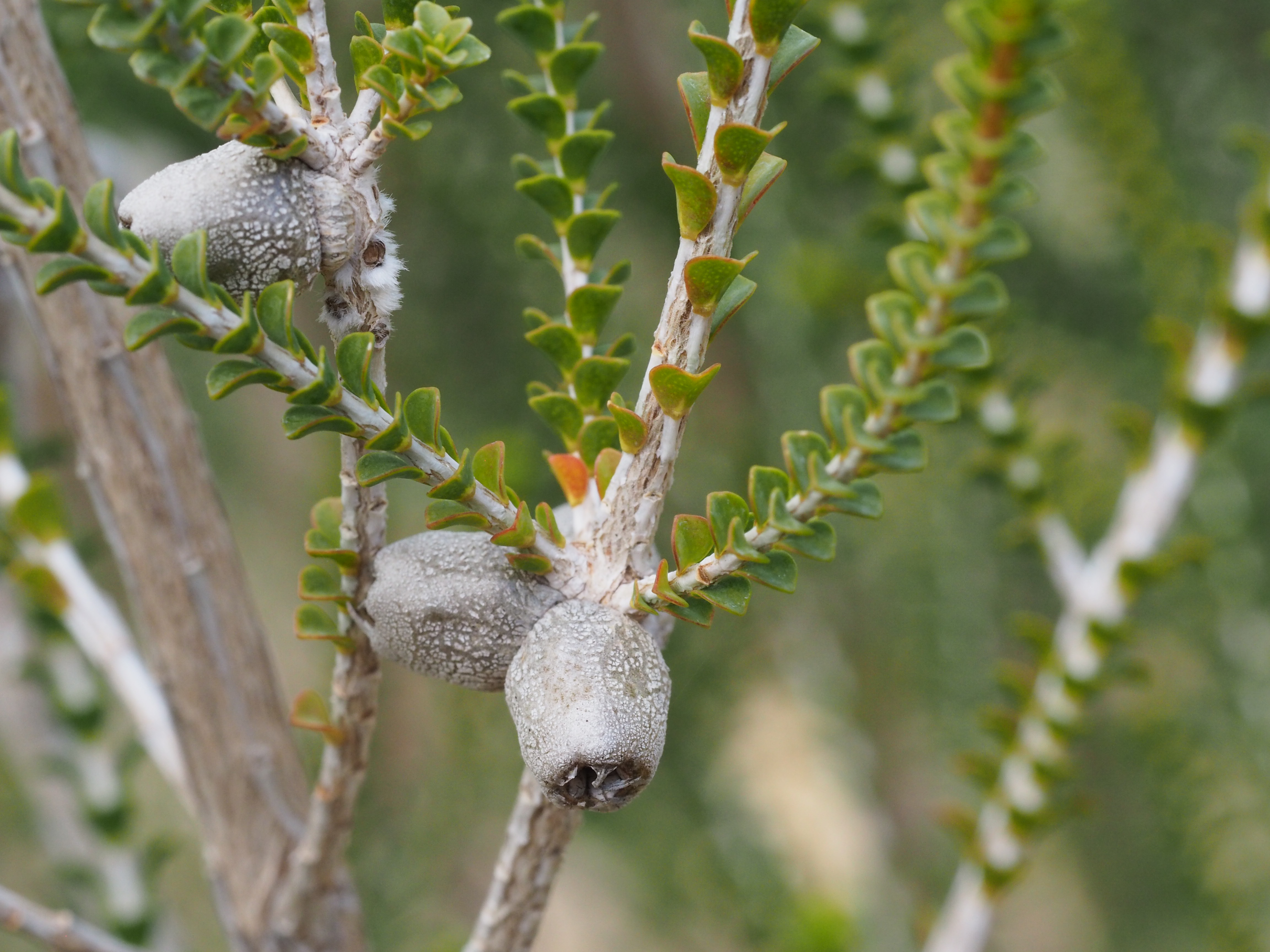
Fruit

Beaufortia sprengelioides is a species of flowering plant in the myrtle family, Myrtaceae and is endemic to the southwest of Western Australia. It is a rigid, spreading shrub with crowded, round leaves and small, roughly spherical heads of pale pink flowers on the ends of its branches. It was one of the first Australian plant species collected by Europeans and has had several name changes since then.

== Description ==
Beaufortia sprengelioides is a rigid, spreading shrub which grows to a height of about 2 metres (7 ft). The leaves are crowded and mostly arranged in alternate pairs (decussate), so that, especially on the younger branches, they make four rows along the stems. The leaves are flat or slightly dished, broadly egg-shaped to round, 2–3 millimetres (0.08–0.1 in) long and have 3 veins, not including the marginal veins.

The flowers are pale pink to white and arranged in spherical heads on the ends of branches which continue to grow after flowering. The flowers have 5 sepals, 5 petals and 5 bundles of stamens. The stamen bundles, which give the flowers their colour, contain 9 to 15 stamens and are joined for more than half their length. Flowering occurs from July to November and is followed by fruits which are woody capsules.

== Taxonomy and naming ==
Beaufortia sprengelioides was collected before 1670 by the English explorer, William Dampier. It was first formally described in 1828 by the Swiss botanist, Augustin de Candolle in Prodromus Systematis Naturalis Regni Vegetabilis and given the name Melaleuca sprengelioides. Schauer then included de Candolle's plant in Regelia ciliata, apparently on the basis of de Candolle's drawings. In 1999, Lyndley Craven reinterpreted Schauer's work and gave the plant the name Beaufortia sprengelioides. The specific epithet ("sprengelioides") is a reference to the genus Sprengelia in the family Ericaceae. The suffix ("-oides") is from the Ancient Greek εἶδος (eîdos), meaning “form" or "likeness".

== Distribution and habitat ==
Beaufortia sprengelioides mainly occurs between Eneabba and Shark Bay, including nearby off-shore islands, in the Avon Wheatbelt, Carnarvon, Geraldton Sandplains and Yalgoo bioregions regions of south-western Western Australia. It usually grows in sand, near limestone on dunes and plains.

== Conservation ==
Beaufortia sprengelioides is classified as "not threatened" by the Western Australian Government Department of Biodiversity, Conservation and Attractions.
