= Fletchers Glen =

Fletcher's Glen
- Main Waterfall

- Location within New South Wales
- Location: New South Wales
- Nearest city: Hardys Bay
- Coordinates: 33.517°S 151.367°E
- Area: 12 ha (30 acres)
- Established: 1995
- Governing body: National Parks and Wildlife Service (NSW)

Fletchers Glen is a small but mature temperate rainforest in Bouddi National Park in New South Wales, Australia. It provides habitat for two threatened plant species — the magenta lily pilly (Syzygium paniculatum) and the paperbark (Melaleuca biconvexa) as well as the only locally known population of snowwood (Pararchidendron pruinosum).

Fletchers Glen contains three waterfalls with a creek flowing into Brisbane Water. The reserve has a wide diversity of flora and fauna.

== Flora and fauna ==
Flora species include:

- Eucalyptus botryoides | Bangalay
- Acmena smithii | Lilly pilly
- Ficus coronata | Sandpaper fig
- Doryphora sassafras | Sassafras
- Glochidion ferdinandi | Cheese tree
- Pararchidendron pruinosum | Snow wood
- Archontophoenix cunninghamiana | Bangalow palm
- Livistona australis | Cabbage tree palm
- Synoum glandulosum | Scentless rosewood

Species of Fauna include:

- Australian brush-turkey
- Powerful owl
- Satin & regent bowerbird
- Lyrebird
- Ringtail possum
- Brushtail possum
- Crayfish
- Eastern water dragon
- Tree snakes
