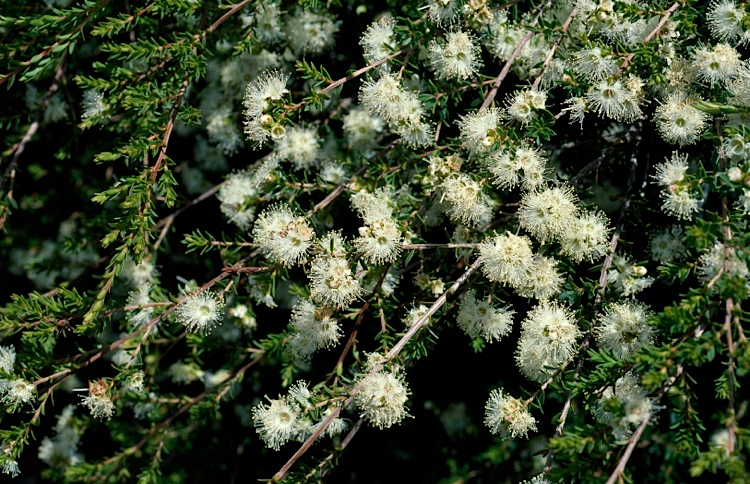
- At Mount Annan Botanic Garden

Scientific classification
- Kingdom: Plantae
- Clade: Tracheophytes
- Clade: Angiosperms
- Clade: Eudicots
- Clade: Rosids
- Order: Myrtales
- Family: Myrtaceae
- Genus: Kunzea
- Species: K. graniticola

Binomial name
- Kunzea graniticola Byrnes

= Kunzea graniticola =

Species of shrub

Kunzea graniticola is a plant in the myrtle family, Myrtaceae and is endemic to Queensland. It is a shrub or small tree with linear to egg-shaped leaves and rounded groups of white or cream-coloured flowers on the ends of the branches in August and September. It is only known from forests near Cardwell and on Hinchinbrook Island.

== Description ==
Kunzea graniticola is a shrub or small tree, sometimes growing to a height of 4 m (10 ft) with well-developed flanges on the branches which have corky rather than peeling bark. The leaves are arranged alternately along the branches and are linear to egg-shaped with the narrower end towards the base. They are mostly 6–9 mm (0.2–0.4 in) long and about 15 mm (0.6 in) wide on a pedicel less than 1 mm (0.04 in) long. The leaves are flat, glabrous and have up to sixty oil glands visible on the lower surface only. The flowers are white or cream-coloured and arranged in rounded groups of three to eight on the ends of all the branches. There are oblong to lance-shaped bracts which are about 2 mm (0.08 in) long and 1 mm (0.04 in) wide and smaller paired bracteoles at the base of each flower. The floral cup is 3.5–4 mm (0.14–0.16 in) long and glabrous. The sepals are triangular, about 1–1.5 mm (0.04–0.06 in) long and glabrous. The petals are broadly egg-shaped, about 2 mm (0.08 in) long and there are eighty or more stamens about 4 mm (0.2 in) long, in several rows. Flowering occurs in August and September.

== Taxonomy and naming ==
Kunzea graniticola was first formally described in 1982 by Norman Brice Byrnes from a specimen found north of Ingham. The description was published in Austrobaileya.

== Distribution and habitat ==
Growing on rocky slopes and on river banks in forest, K. graniticola occurs on Hinchinbrook Island and nearby mainland areas near Cardwell.

== Conservation ==
Kunzea graniticola is classified as "Least Concern" under the Queensland Nature Conservation Act 1992.
