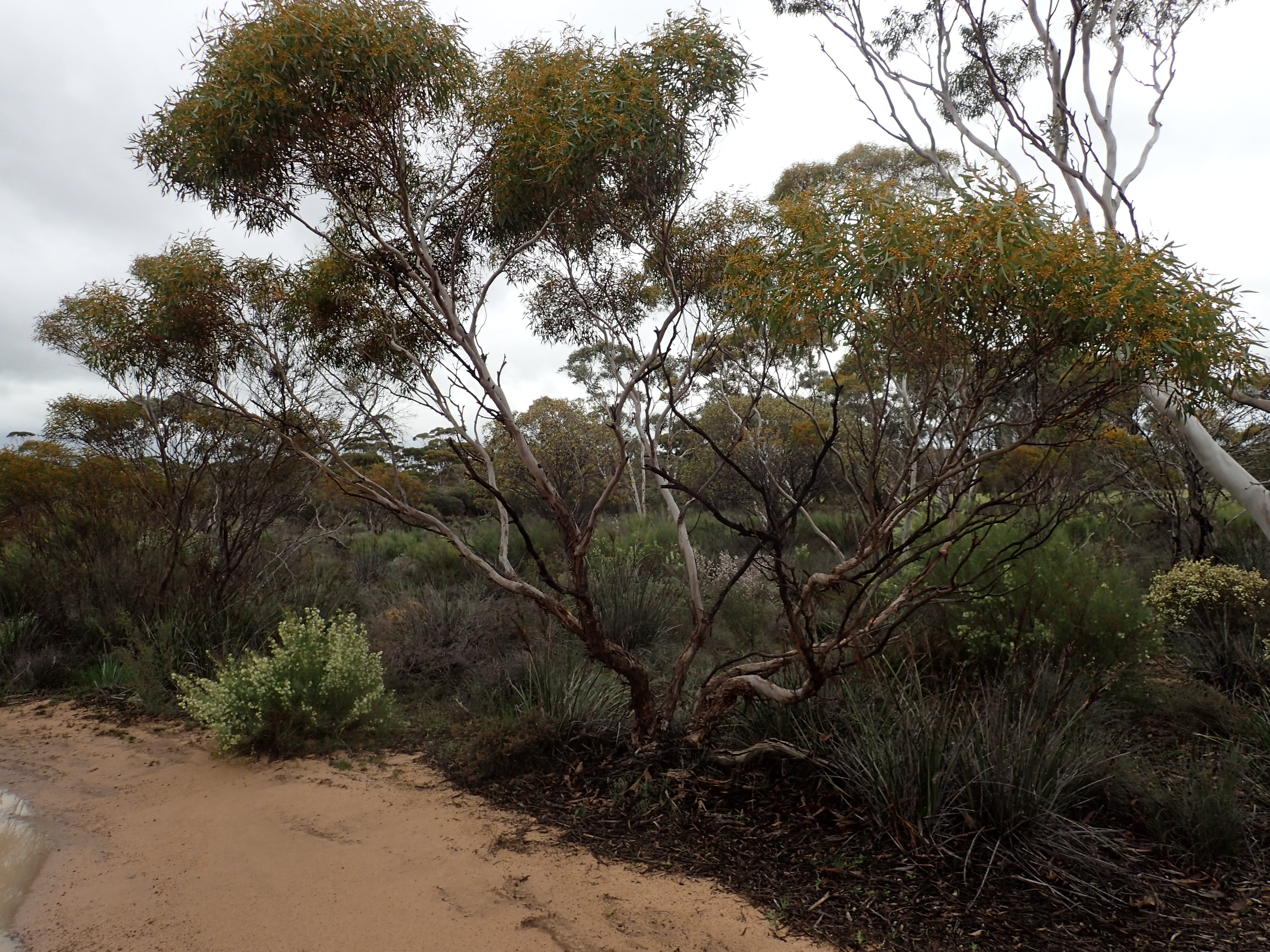
- In Corrigin Nature Reserve

Scientific classification
- Kingdom: Plantae
- Clade: Tracheophytes
- Clade: Angiosperms
- Clade: Eudicots
- Clade: Rosids
- Order: Myrtales
- Family: Myrtaceae
- Genus: Eucalyptus
- Species: E. yilgarnensis

Binomial name
- Eucalyptus yilgarnensis (Maiden) Brooker

= Eucalyptus yilgarnensis =

Yorrell

Species of eucalyptus

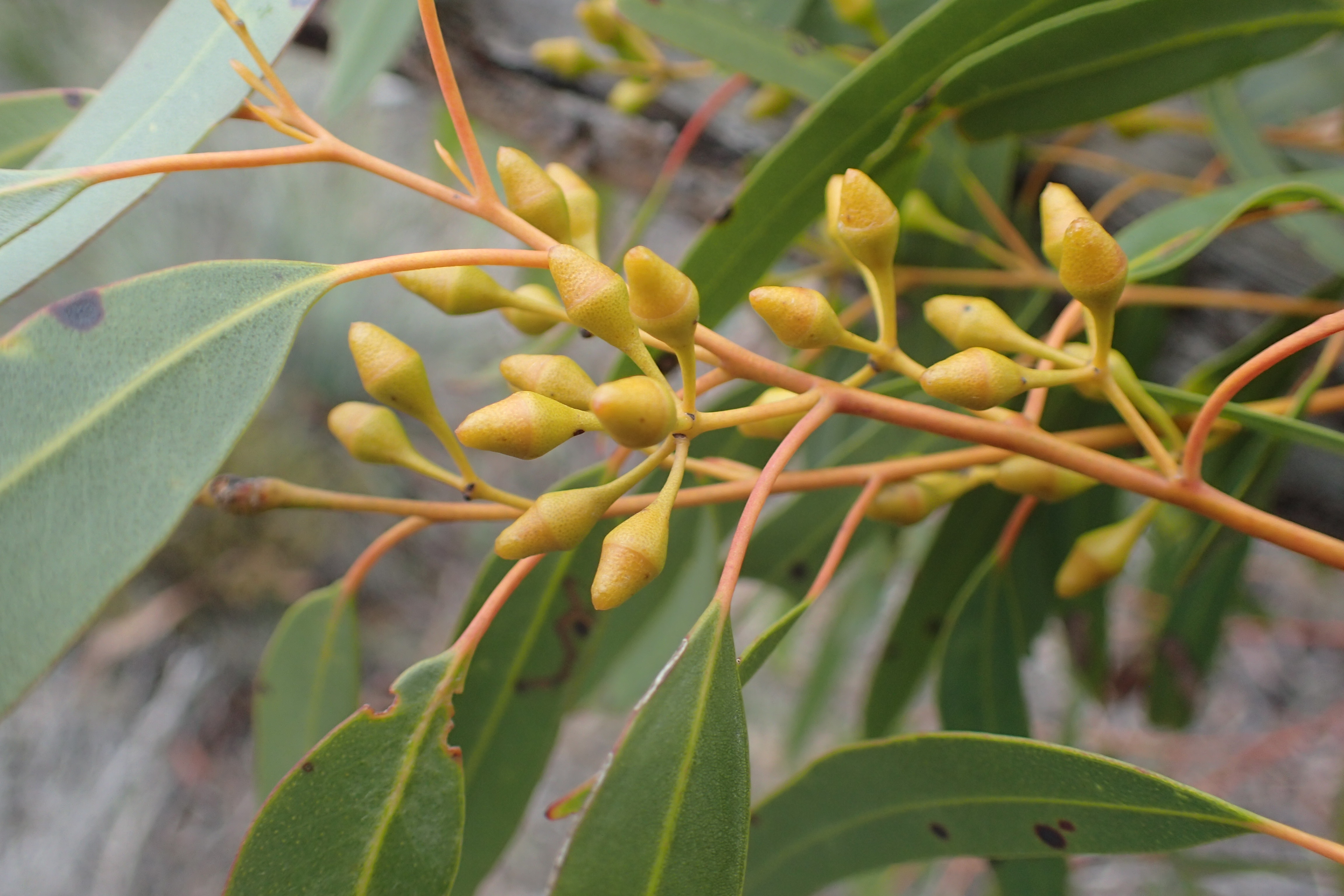
Flower buds

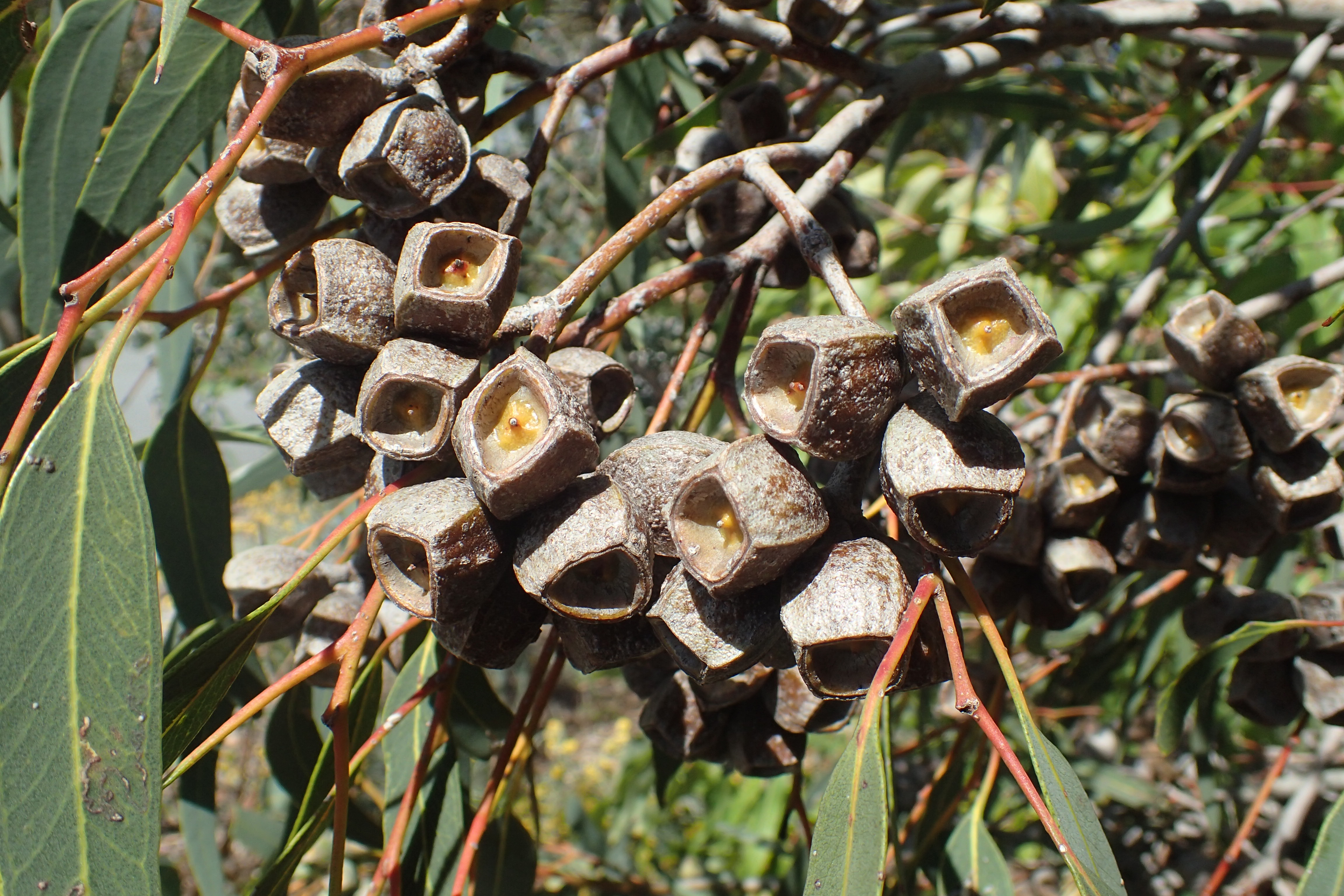
Fruit

Eucalyptus yilgarnensis, commonly known as yorrell or yorrel, is a species of mallee, rarely a small tree, that is endemic to Western Australia. It usually has rough bark on the trunk, smooth bark above, linear to narrow elliptical or narrow lance-shaped adult leaves, flower buds in groups of seven or nine, white flowers and barrel-shaped fruit.

== Description ==
Eucalyptus yilgarnensis is a mallee or tree that typically grows to a height of up to 10 m (33 ft) and forms a lignotuber. It usually has rough, fibrous brown bark, smooth grey to brown bark above, sometimes smooth bark throughout. Young plants and coppice regrowth have dull bluish grey, narrow elliptical, lance-shaped or egg-shaped leaves that are 40–70 mm (1.6–2.8 in) long and 10–23 mm (0.39–0.91 in) wide and petiolate. Adult leaves are the same shade of glossy green on both sides, linear to narrow elliptical or narrow lance-shaped, 50–80 mm (2.0–3.1 in) long and 5–15 mm (0.20–0.59 in) wide, tapering to a petiole 5–25 mm (0.20–0.98 in) long. The flowers are arranged in leaf axils in groups of seven or nine on an unbranched peduncle 4–15 mm (0.16–0.59 in) long, the individual buds on pedicels 2–6 mm (0.079–0.236 in) long. Mature buds are oval or pear-shaped, 3–6 mm (0.12–0.24 in) long and 2–3 mm (0.079–0.118 in) wide with a rounded to conical operculum 1–2 mm (0.039–0.079 in) long. Flowering occurs from April to November and the flowers are white. The fruit is a woody, barrel-shaped capsule 4–6 mm (0.16–0.24 in) long and 3–4 mm (0.12–0.16 in) wide with the valves below rim level.

== Taxonomy and naming ==
Yorrell was first formally described in 1919 by Joseph Maiden who published the description in Journal and Proceedings of New South Wales and gave it the name Eucalyptus gracilis var. yilgarnensis. In 1986, Ian Brooker raised the variety to species status as E. yilgarnensis.

== Distribution and habitat ==
Eucalyptus yilgarnensis grows on sandy soil in low, open woodland between Wongan Hills, Kalgoorlie, Zanthus, Balladonia and Salmon Gums.

Associated species in the woodland overstorey include E. salubris and E. salmonophloia and sometimes E. melanoxylon and E. oleosa. Plants found in the understorey shrubs include Acacia colletioides, Atriplex vesicaria, A. paludosa, Melaleuca hamulosa, Regelia cymbifolia, Exocarpos aphyllus and Grevillea acuaria.

== Conservation status ==
This eucalypt is classified as "not threatened" by the Western Australian Government Department of Parks and Wildlife.

== See also ==
- List of Eucalyptus species
