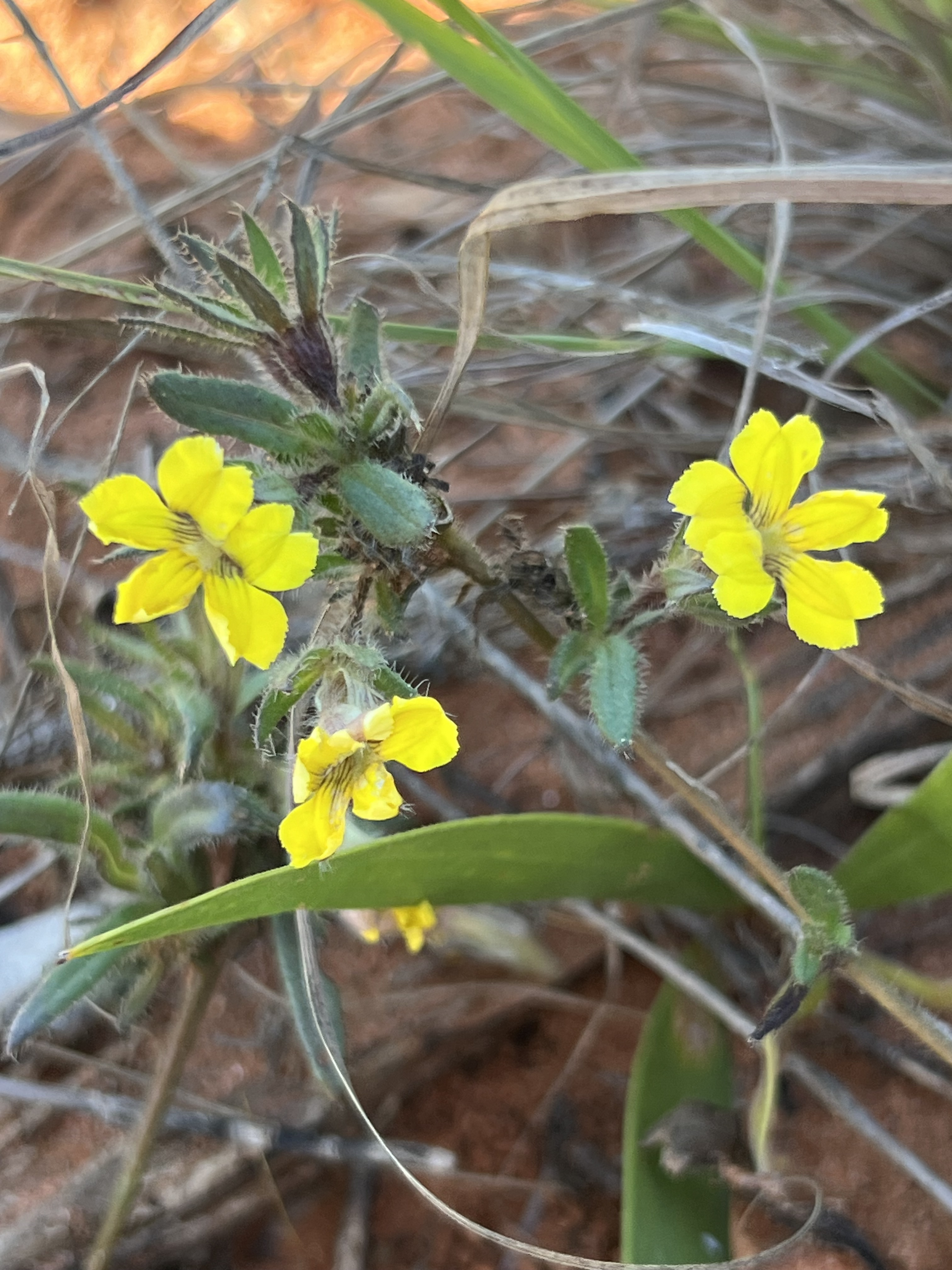
- Near Broome

Scientific classification
- Kingdom: Plantae
- Clade: Tracheophytes
- Clade: Angiosperms
- Clade: Eudicots
- Clade: Asterids
- Order: Asterales
- Family: Goodeniaceae
- Genus: Goodenia
- Species: G. sepalosa

Binomial name
- Goodenia sepalosa F.Muell. ex Benth.

= Goodenia sepalosa =

Species of plant

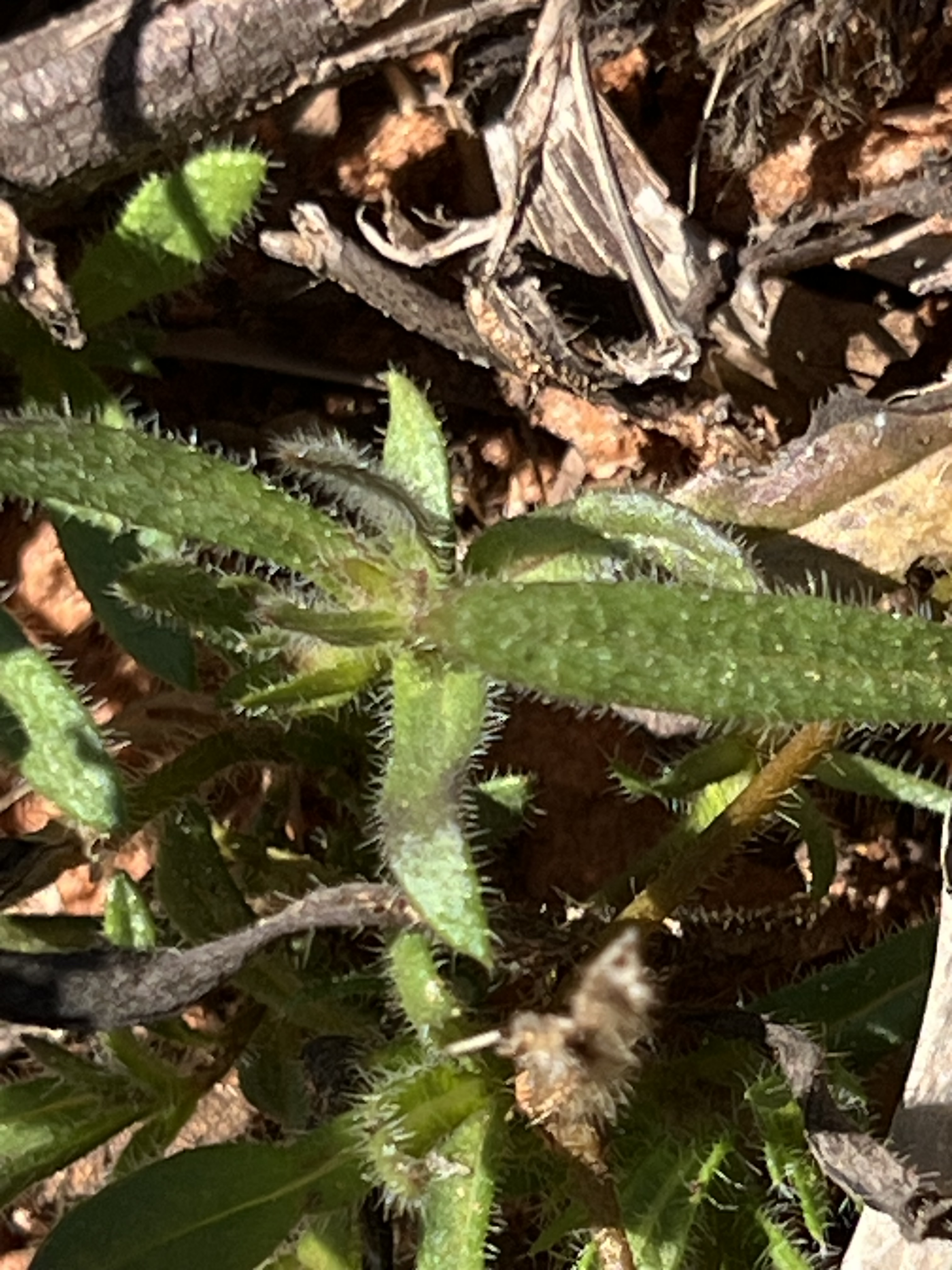
Foliage

Goodenia sepalosa is a species of flowering plant in the family Goodeniaceae and is endemic to northern Australia. It is a prostrate to ascending herb with narrow oblong to lance-shaped leaves, the narrower end towards the base, and racemes of yellow flowers.

== Description ==
Goodenia sepalosa is a prostrate to ascending herb that typically grows to a height of up to 40 cm (16 in), and has hairy foliage. The leaves on the stems are narrow oblong to lance-shaped with the narrower end towards the base, 10–50 mm (0.39–1.97 in) long and 3–8 mm (0.12–0.31 in) wide. The flowers are arranged in racemes sometimes up to 200 mm (7.9 in) long with leaf-like bracts, each flower on a pedicel 10–20 mm (0.39–0.79 in) long. The sepals are narrow elliptic to egg-shaped, 7–12 mm (0.28–0.47 in) long, the corolla yellow, 8–15 mm (0.31–0.59 in) long. The lower lobes of the corolla are 3–5 mm (0.12–0.20 in) long with wings 1.0–1.5 mm (0.039–0.059 in) wide. Flowering mainly occurs from April to July.

== Taxonomy and naming ==
Goodenia sepalosa was first formally described in 1868 by George Bentham from an unpublished description by Ferdinand von Mueller in Flora Australiensis. The specific epithet (sepalosa) means "abounding in sepals".

Bentham described two varieties of G. sepalosa and in 1990 Roger Charles Carolin described a third. The names of two varieties are accepted by the Australian Plant Census:

- Goodenia sepalosa var. glandulosa Carolin differs from the autonym in having mainly glandular hairs;
- Goodenia sepalosa F.Muell. ex Benth. var. sepalosa, the autonym, has mostly simple hairs.

== Distribution ==
This goodenia grows in sandy soil in the Kimberley region of Western Australia and the northern part of the Northern Territory. Variety glandulosa is only known from the collection made by Norman Byrnes near Derby in 1967.

== Conservation status ==
Goodenia sepalosa is classified as "not threatened" by the Government of Western Australia Department of Parks and Wildlife and of "least concern" under the Northern Territory Government Territory Parks and Wildlife Conservation Act 1976. Variety glandulosa is classified as "Priority Three" by the Government of Western Australia Department of Parks and Wildlife meaning that it is poorly known and known from only a few locations but is not under imminent threat.
