= Verticordia sect. Tropica =

Scientific classification
- Kingdom: Plantae
- Clade: Tracheophytes
- Clade: Angiosperms
- Clade: Eudicots
- Clade: Rosids
- Order: Myrtales
- Family: Myrtaceae
- Genus: Verticordia
- Subgenus: Verticordia subg. Eperephes
- Section: Verticordia sect. Tropica; A.S.George

Type species
- Verticordia cunninghamii A.S.George

Species
- 3 species: see text.

Group of flowering plants

Verticordia sect. Tropica is one of six sections in the subgenus Eperephes. It includes three species of plants in the genus Verticordia. Plants in this section occur are the only verticordias to occur in tropical areas of Western Australia and the Northern Territory, including the Kimberley and Kakadu National Park and they have the ability to regrow from a lignotuber after fire. (One species, V. decussata, is endemic to the Northern Territory.) They have leaves which vary in size from tiny and pressed against the stem to long and curved but are always linear in shape. The flowers have fringed petals and lobed sepals with small, ear-like appendages and the style has a narrow band of hairs near its tip.

When Alex George reviewed the genus in 1991, he described the section and gave it the name Tropica. The name Tropica is a Latin word meaning "solstice" referring to the tropical distribution of these species.

The type species for this section is Verticordia cunninghamii and the other two species are V. verticillata, V. decussata.
