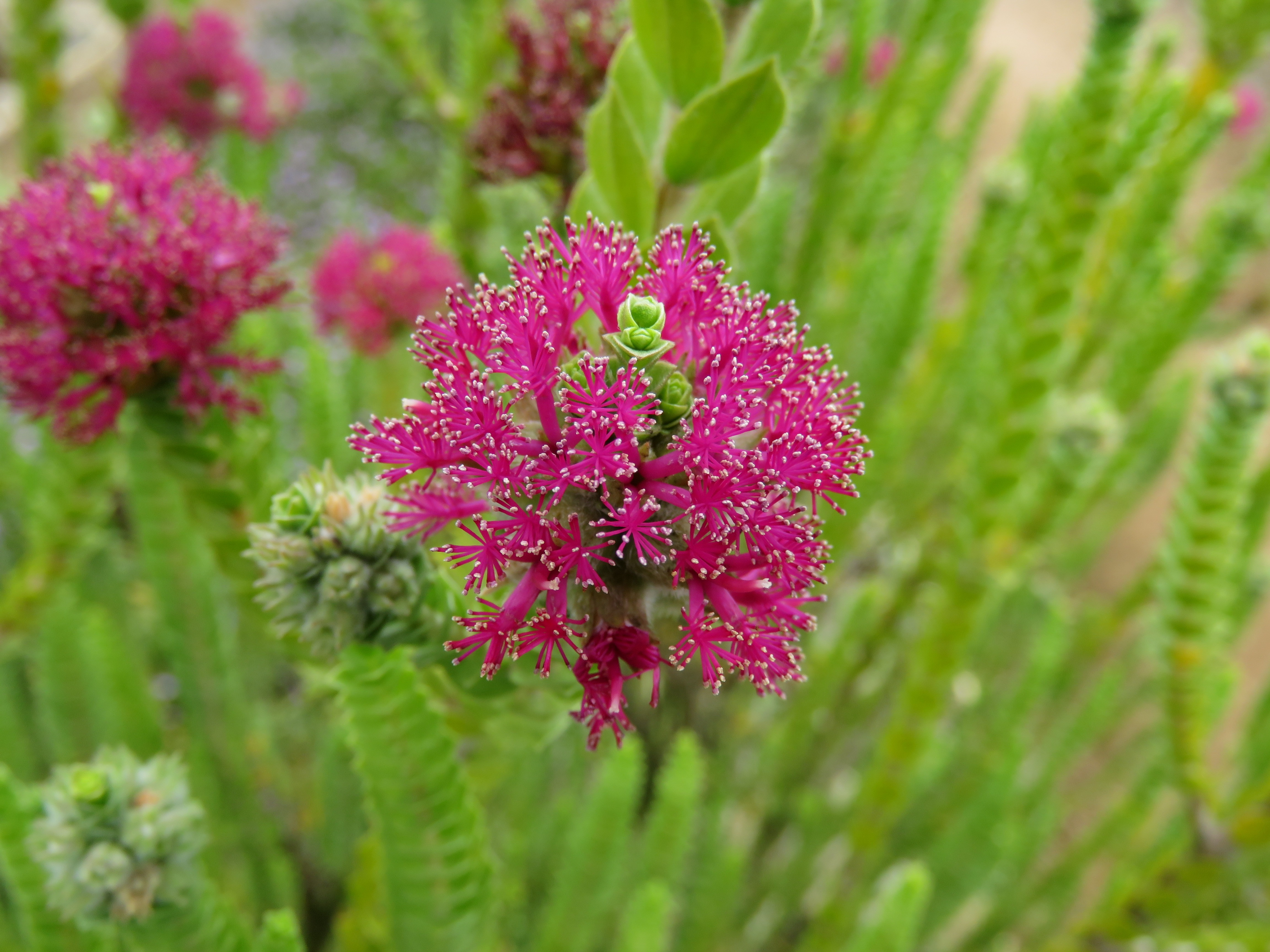
- Regelia megacephala inflorescence in Royal Botanic Gardens, Cranbourne

Scientific classification
- Kingdom: Plantae
- Clade: Tracheophytes
- Clade: Angiosperms
- Clade: Eudicots
- Clade: Rosids
- Order: Myrtales
- Family: Myrtaceae
- Subfamily: Myrtoideae
- Tribe: Melaleuceae
- Genus: Regelia; Schauer

Species
- See text

= Regelia =

Genus of flowering plants

Regelia is a genus of flowering plants in the family Myrtaceae and is endemic to the south-west of Western Australia. The genus is composed of five species of small leaved, evergreen shrubs which have heads of flowers on the ends of branches which continue to grow after flowering. Another species, previously known as Regelia punicea and which is endemic to Kakadu National Park in the Northern Territory, has been transferred to Melaleuca punicea.

== Description ==
Plants in the genus Regelia are woody, evergreen shrubs ranging in height from 1–6 metres (3–20 ft). Their leaves are small, arranged in opposite pairs or spirally and are noted for bearing essential oils. Their flowers are pinkish purple, rarely red, and are arranged in heads on the ends of branches which continue to grow after flowering. The flowers have 5 sepals, 5 petals and numerous stamens arranged in 5 bundles around the edge of the flower. In many respects, they are similar to plants in the genera Melaleuca, Calothamnus, Conothamnus and Phymatocarpus but differ from them either in the attachment of the anthers to their stalks, the way they open to release pollen, or the number of seeds in the fruits. Plants in the genus Regelia have their anthers attached at the base (rather than the side) and open at terminal pores (rather than slits). The fruits are woody capsules with three valves and have a maximum of two fertile seeds in each valve.

== Taxonomy and naming ==
The genus Regelia was first formally described in 1843 by J.C.Schauer in the journal Linnaea; Ein Journal für die Botanik in ihrem ganzen Umfange and the first species he named was Regelia ciliata. The name Regelia honours German gardener and botanist Eduard August von Regel.

== Distribution and habitat ==
All five Regelia species are found in the South West Botanical Province. They grow in sand or sandy soil, often on the margins of winter-wet depressions.

== Conservation ==
Two species, Regelia cymbifolia and Regelia megacephala, are classified as "Priority Four" by the Western Australian government Department of Parks and Wildlife meaning that they are rare or near threatened.

== Species ==
There are currently five recognized species of Regelia. A sixth species, Regelia punicea was originally formally described in 1984 by N.B.Byrnes as Melaleuca punicea, renamed Regelia punicea by B.A.Barlow in 1987, then Petraeomyrtus punicea by L.A.Craven in 2010 and finally in 2013, returned to Melaleuca punicea by Craven on the basis of molecular data.

- Regelia ciliata Schauer ;
- Regelia cymbifolia (Diels) C.A.Gardner ;
- Regelia inops (Schauer) Schauer;
- Regelia megacephala C.A.Gardner ;
- Regelia velutina (Turcz.) C.A.Gardner – Barrens regelia.
