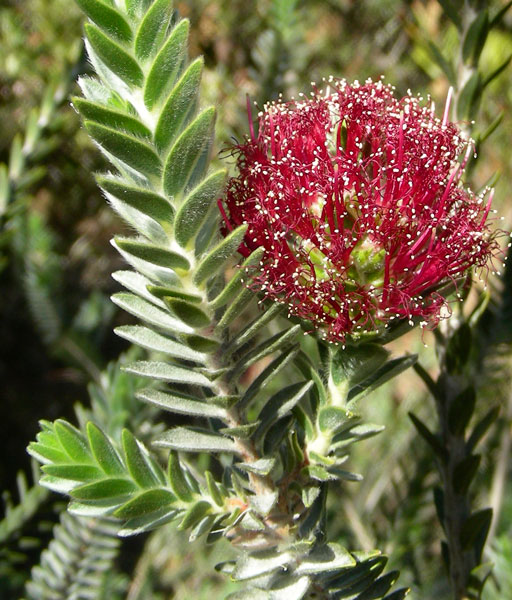
- Regelia velutina in the Peter Francis Points Arboretum, Coleraine, Victoria

Conservation status
- Least Concern (IUCN 3.1)

Scientific classification
- Kingdom: Plantae
- Clade: Tracheophytes
- Clade: Angiosperms
- Clade: Eudicots
- Clade: Rosids
- Order: Myrtales
- Family: Myrtaceae
- Genus: Regelia
- Species: R. velutina

Binomial name
- Regelia velutina (Turcz.) C.A.Gardner

Synonyms
- Melaleuca velutina (Turcz.) Craven & R.D.Edwards

= Regelia velutina =

Species of flowering plant

Regelia velutina, the Barrens regelia, is a species of flowering plant in the myrtle family Myrtaceae. It is endemic to the south-west of Western Australia. It is a large shrub with greyish green, velvety leaves and large clusters of brilliant red to orange flowers on the ends of its branches in spring and summer.

== Description ==
Regelia velutina is a large shrub, sometimes a small tree growing to a height of 6 m (20 ft), with long, straight stems. Its leaves, which are up to 13 mm (0.51 in) long are arranged in alternating pairs (decussate) so that they make four rows along the stems.

The flowers are reddish-orange, sometimes yellow, and arranged in almost spherical heads on the ends of branches which continue to grow after flowering. There are 5 sepals, 5 petals and 5 bundles of stamens in each flower. Flowering occurs from September to November, sometimes to February and is followed by fruit which are woody capsules.

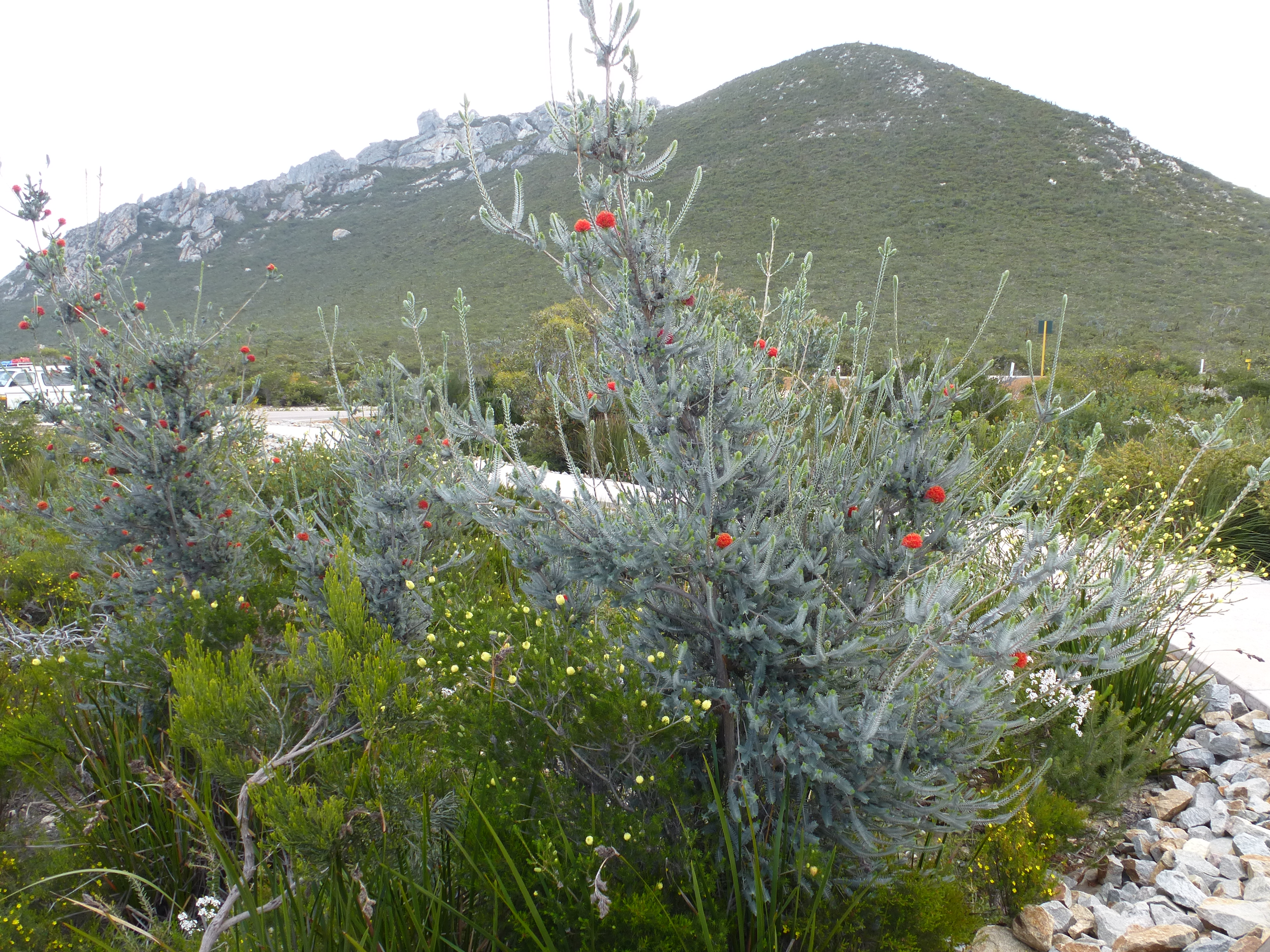
R. velutina growing near East Mount Barren

== Taxonomy and naming ==
The species was first formally described by Russian botanist, Nikolai Turczaninow in 1852 who named it Beaufortia velutina. In 1964, the Australian botanist Charles Austin Gardner transferred it to the genus Regelia. The specific epithet is derived from the Neo-Latin velutinus, meaning "velvety".

== Distribution and habitat ==
Regelia velutina grows in sandy soil in rocky areas in the Avon Wheatbelt and Esperance Plains biogeographic regions.

It is listed as "not threatened" by the Government of Western Australia Department of Parks and Wildlife.

== Use in horticulture ==
Although it has attractive foliage and flowers, R. velutina is not common in cultivation. It does not grow well in areas of high summer rainfall and humidity. In drier climates it prefers well drained soils. It is easy to propagate from seed but the leaves may rot if mist propagation systems are used. Its commercial potential for export as a Christmas flower has been assessed.
