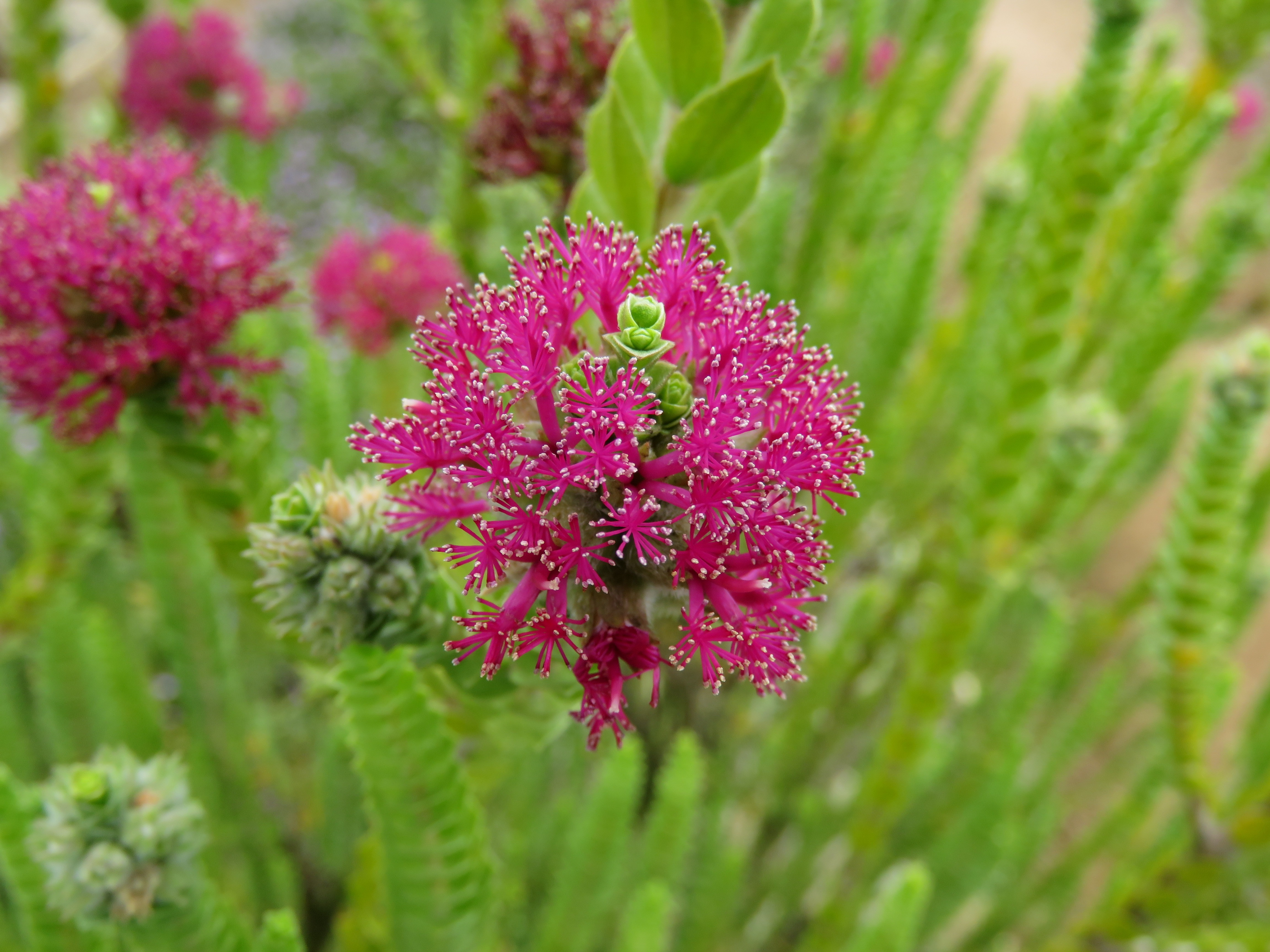
- R. megacephala inflorescence in Royal Botanic Gardens, Cranbourne

Conservation status
- Priority Four — Rare Taxa (DEC)

Scientific classification
- Kingdom: Plantae
- Clade: Tracheophytes
- Clade: Angiosperms
- Clade: Eudicots
- Clade: Rosids
- Order: Myrtales
- Family: Myrtaceae
- Genus: Regelia
- Species: R. megacephala

Binomial name
- Regelia megacephala C.A.Gardner

Synonyms
- Melaleuca gardneri Craven & R.D.Edwards

= Regelia megacephala =

Species of shrub

Regelia megacephala is a plant in the myrtle family, Myrtaceae and is endemic to the south-west of Western Australia. It is a taller shrub than others in its genus, with small, rounded leaves and clusters of purplish-red flowers from October to December.

== Description ==
Regelia megacephala is an erect, straggly shrub which grows to a height of 2–5 m (7–20 ft). Its leaves are small and are arranged in alternating pairs (decussate) so that they make four rows along its long stems.

The flowers are mauve and arranged in dense heads 15 mm (0.6 in) across on the ends of long stems which continue to grow after flowering. There are 5 sepals, 5 petals and 5 bundles of stamens. Flowering occurs from September to December and is followed by fruit which are woody capsules.

== Taxonomy and naming ==
Regelia megacephala was first formally described in 1964 by the Australian botanist, Charles Gardner in Journal of the Royal Society of Western Australia. The specific epithet (megacephala) means "large-headed".

== Distribution and habitat ==
Regelia megacephala grows in red sand on rocky quartzite hills in the Avon Wheatbelt and Swan Coastal Plain biogeographic regions. It is closely associated with Coomberdale chert which is mined for the production of silicon and is threatened by mining activity.

== Conservation ==
Regelia megacephala is classified as "Priority Four" by the Western Australian Government Department of Parks and Wildlife meaning that is rare or near threatened.

== Use in horticulture ==
Regelia megacephala is not often seen in cultivation but is frost hardy, will grow in full or partial sun and is suitable for narrow gardens. Its commercial potential for export as a Christmas flower has been assessed.
