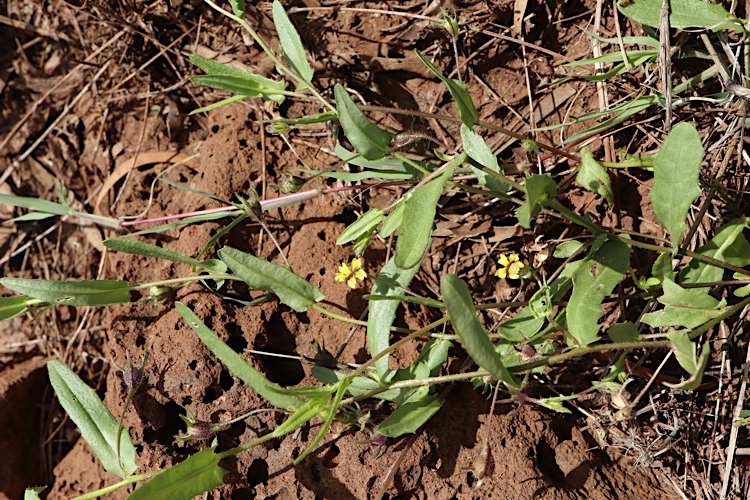

Scientific classification
- Kingdom: Plantae
- Clade: Tracheophytes
- Clade: Angiosperms
- Clade: Eudicots
- Clade: Asterids
- Order: Asterales
- Family: Goodeniaceae
- Genus: Goodenia
- Species: G. byrnesii

Binomial name
- Goodenia byrnesii Carolin

= Goodenia byrnesii =

Species of plant

Goodenia byrnesii is a species of flowering plant in the family Goodeniaceae and is endemic to northern Australia. It is prostrate to low-lying herb with short-lived, lance-shaped leaves at the base, egg-shaped to oblong, toothed stem leaves, and leafy racemes of yellow flowers.

== Description ==
Goodenia byrnesii is a prostrate to low-lying herb with stems up to 30 cm (12 in) long. The leaves at the base of the plant are short-lived, lance-shaped with the narrower end towards the base, 30–60 mm (1.2–2.4 in) long and 6–10 mm (0.24–0.39 in) wide, the stem leaves egg-shaped to oblong, mostly 40–60 mm (1.6–2.4 in) long and 5–10 mm (0.20–0.39 in) wide and sessile. The flowers are arranged in racemes up to 250 mm (9.8 in) long on a peduncle 30–50 mm (1.2–2.0 in) long with leaf-like bracts at the base. The sepals are narrow oblong to elliptic, 5–6 mm (0.20–0.24 in) long and 0.8–1 mm (0.031–0.039 in) wide, the petals yellow, 17–20 mm (0.67–0.79 in) long. The lower lobes of the corolla are 6–7 mm (0.24–0.28 in) long with wings about 1.5 mm (0.059 in) wide. Flowering occurs from January to June and the fruit is a more or less spherical capsule 4–5 mm (0.16–0.20 in) in diameter.

== Taxonomy and naming ==
Goodenia byrnesii was first formally described in 1990 by Roger Charles Carolin in the journal Telopea from specimens collected near Elliott by Norman Byrnes. The specific epithet (byrnesii) honours the collector of the type.

== Distribution and habitat ==
This goodenia grows on black soil plains in the Kimberley region of Western Australia, the northern part of the Northern Territory and the Burke district of north-west Queensland.
