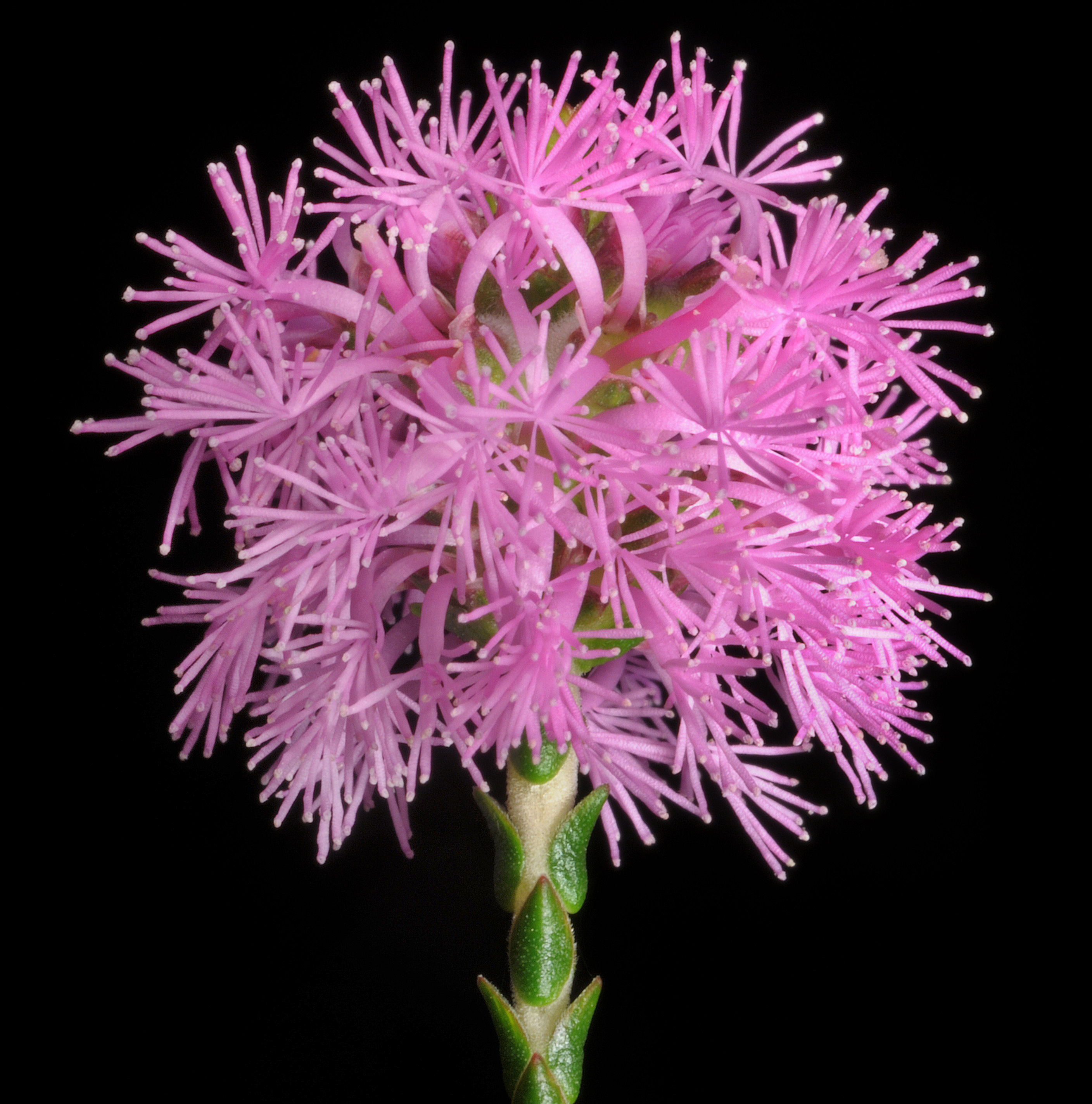
- Flowers and leaves

Scientific classification
- Kingdom: Plantae
- Clade: Tracheophytes
- Clade: Angiosperms
- Clade: Eudicots
- Clade: Rosids
- Order: Myrtales
- Family: Myrtaceae
- Genus: Regelia
- Species: R. inops

Binomial name
- Regelia inops (Schauer) Schauer

Synonyms
- Melaleuca inops (Schauer) Craven & R.D.Edwards

= Regelia inops =

Species of flowering plant

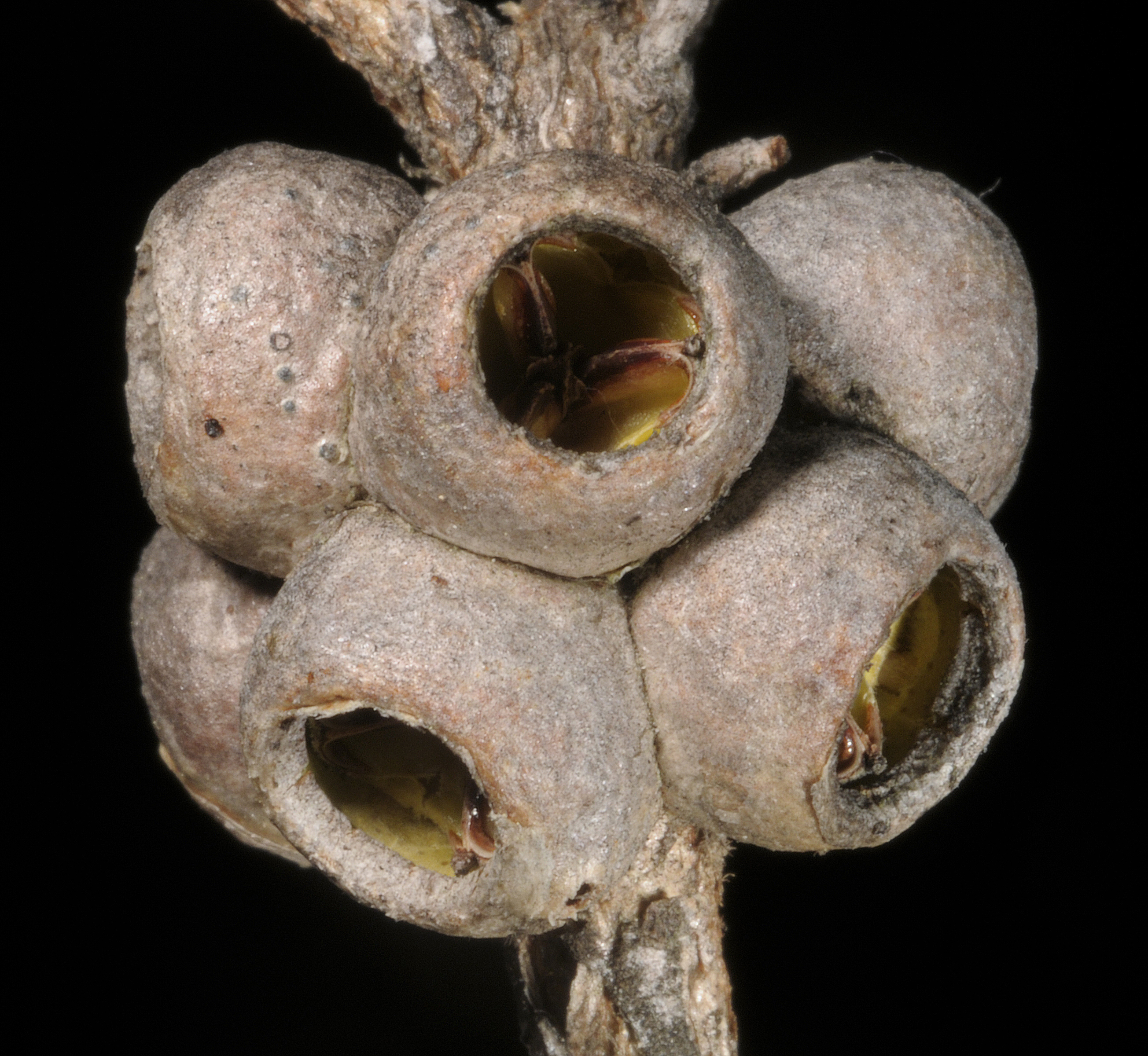
Fruit

Regelia inops is a plant in the myrtle family, Myrtaceae and is endemic to the south-west of Western Australia. It is an upright but often spreading shrub with tiny wedge shaped leaves and small heads of pink flowers on the ends of its branches in the warmer months.

== Description ==
Regelia inops is an upright, often spreading shrub which grows to a height of 0.75–2.5 m (2–8 ft). The leaves are arranged in alternating pairs (decussate) so that they make four rows along the stems. They are egg-shaped or triangular, and 1–4 mm (0.04–0.2 in) long with their lower part pressed against the stem.

The flowers are mauve and arranged in small heads on the ends of branches which continue to grow after flowering and sometimes also on small side branches. There are 5 sepals, 5 petals and 5 bundles of stamens. The stamens, which give the flowers their colour, are about 6.5 mm (0.3 in) long and are joined for about half their length. Flowering occurs in the warmer months and is followed by fruit which are woody capsules, often in small, almost spherical clusters around the stem.

== Taxonomy and naming ==
Regelia inops was first formally described in 1848 by J.C.Schauer in the journal Plantae Preissianae. He had previously given it the name Beaufortia inops. The specific epithet (inops) is a Latin word meaning "poor", "helpless" or "weak".

== Distribution and habitat ==
This regelia is widely distributed in the Avon Wheatbelt, Coolgardie, Esperance Plains, Jarrah Forest, Mallee and Swan Coastal Plain biogeographic regions. It grows in sandy soils on sandplains and in areas that are wet in winter.

== Conservation ==
Regelia inops is classified as "not threatened" by the Western Australian Government Department of Parks and Wildlife.

== Use in horticulture ==
The neat foliage and well displayed flowers make Regelia inops a suitable plant for gardens. It is easily propagated from seed or from cuttings.
