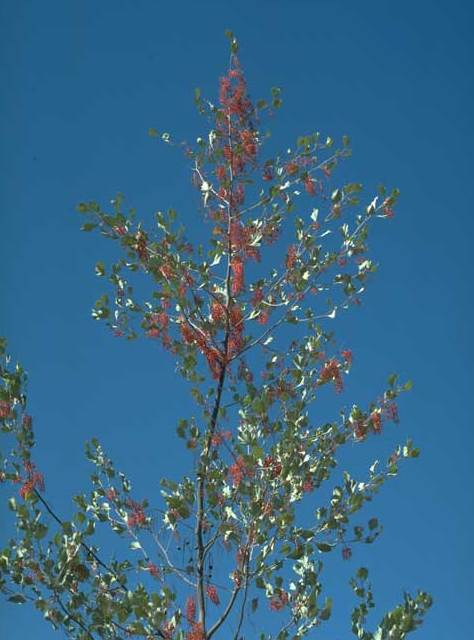

Conservation status
- Least Concern (IUCN 3.1)

Scientific classification
- Kingdom: Plantae
- Clade: Embryophytes
- Clade: Tracheophytes
- Clade: Spermatophytes
- Clade: Angiosperms
- Clade: Eudicots
- Order: Proteales
- Family: Proteaceae
- Genus: Grevillea
- Species: G. byrnesii

Binomial name
- Grevillea byrnesii McGill.

= Grevillea byrnesii =

Species of shrub native to Australia

Grevillea byrnesii is a species of flowering plant in the family Proteaceae and is endemic to north-western Australia. It is a shrub with broadly egg-shaped leaves and orange flowers.

== Description ==
Grevillea byrnesii is a shrub that typically grows to a height of 3–5.5 m (9.8–18.0 ft). Its leaves are broadly egg-shaped, sometimes with the narrower end towards the base, 75–120 mm (3.0–4.7 in) long and 35–70 mm (1.4–2.8 in) wide, sometimes with up to seven coarse teeth on the edges. The flowers are arranged in loose cone-shaped or cylindrical groups in leaf axils or at the ends of branchlets, the rachis 50–120 mm (2.0–4.7 in) long, each flower on a downturned pedicel 6–10 mm (0.24–0.39 in) long. The flowers are orange, the pistil is 9–11 mm (0.35–0.43 in) long and the style has a yellow tip. Flowering occurs from May to August and the fruit is a glabrous follicle 17–24 mm (0.67–0.94 in) long.

== Taxonomy ==
Grevillea byrnesii was first formally described in 1986 by Donald McGillivray in his book New Names in Grevillea (Proteaceae), based on specimens he collected in 1978. The specific epithet (byrnesii) honours Norman Byrnes.

== Distribution and habitat ==
This grevillea grows in shrubland and open woodland on ridge tops and sand dunes in the East Kimberley and Great Sandy Desert regions of northern Western Australia, and in the Victoria River district of the Northern Territory.

== Conservation status ==
Grevillea byrnesii is listed as least concern on the IUCN Red List of Threatened Species and under the Northern Territory Government Territory Parks and Wildlife Conservation Act. It is also listed as not threatened by the Government of Western Australia Department of Biodiversity, Conservation and Attractions.
