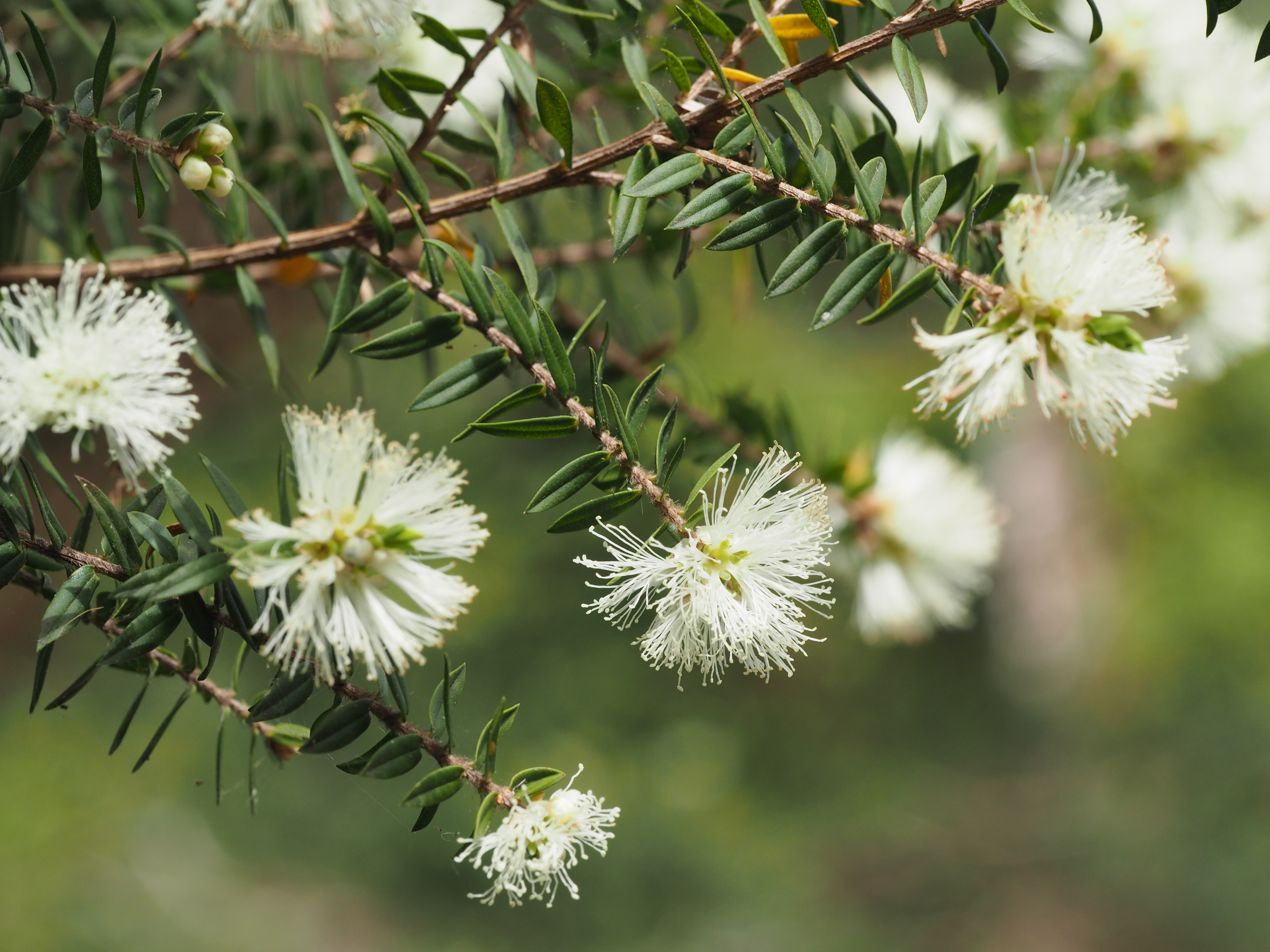

Conservation status
- Vulnerable (EPBC Act)

Scientific classification
- Kingdom: Plantae
- Clade: Tracheophytes
- Clade: Angiosperms
- Clade: Eudicots
- Clade: Rosids
- Order: Myrtales
- Family: Myrtaceae
- Genus: Melaleuca
- Species: M. biconvexa

Binomial name
- Melaleuca biconvexa Byrnes

= Melaleuca biconvexa =

Species of shrub

Melaleuca biconvexa is a tree or shrub in the myrtle family, Myrtaceae and is endemic to coastal areas of New South Wales. The leaves have a distinctive, wing-like shape and the flowers are in white or cream-coloured heads at the ends of its branches. It is classified as a vulnerable species.

== Description ==
Melaleuca biconvexa grows to a height of 3–10 m (10–30 ft) (sometimes to 20 m (70 ft)) and has fibrous to papery bark. Its leaves are arranged in alternating pairs (decussate), 6.5–18 mm (0.3–0.7 in) long and 2–4 mm (0.08–0.2 in) wide, narrow oval in shape. The leaves are distinctive in having the mid-vein in a groove with either side of the leaf blade curving up wing-like from this vein.

The flowers are cream to white, at or near the ends of the branches in heads of 2 to 10 flowers, the heads up to 17 millimetres (0.7 in) in diameter. The stamens are arranged in five bundles around the flower with 10 to 20 stamens per bundle. Flowering occurs over 3 to 4 weeks in September and November and is followed by fruit which are urn-shaped, woody capsules about 3–5 mm (0.1–0.2 in) in diameter and 3–4 mm (0.1–0.2 in) long with the sepals remaining as teeth on the rim.

== Taxonomy and naming ==
Melaleuca boconvexa was first formally described in 1984 by Norman Byrnes in the journal Austrobaileya. The specific epithet (biconvexa) refers to the shape of the leaves in cross section.

The name Melaleuca pauciflora Turcz. was misapplied to this taxon for many years before Byrnes's 1984 paper.

== Distribution and habitat ==
This melaleuca occurs in scattered populations in coastal areas from Port Macquarie to Jervis Bay. It grows in damp places, often near streams or low-lying areas, often in eucalypt forest on sandy alluvial soil, on low slopes and sheltered places.

== Conservation status ==
Melaleuca biconvexa is able to resprout after fire but faces a number of threats to its survival including land clearing, alteration of drainage patterns and swamp reclamation, grazing and trampling by stock and competition from noxious aquatic weeds such as Sagittaria platyphylla. Most populations are on private land, making conservation efforts difficult and the species has been classified as vulnerable under the Biodiversity Conservation Act 2016.

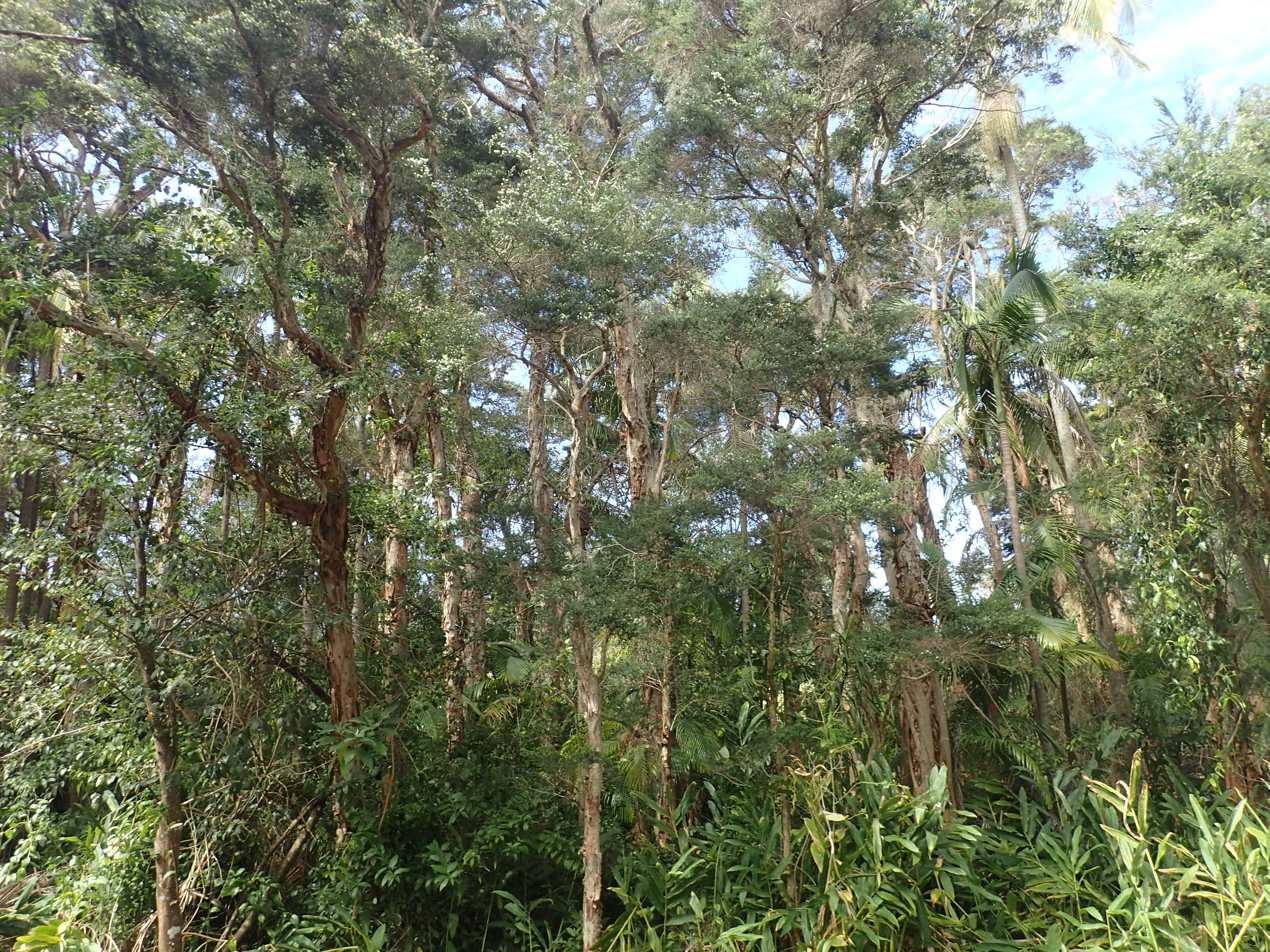
Habit in Port Macquarie

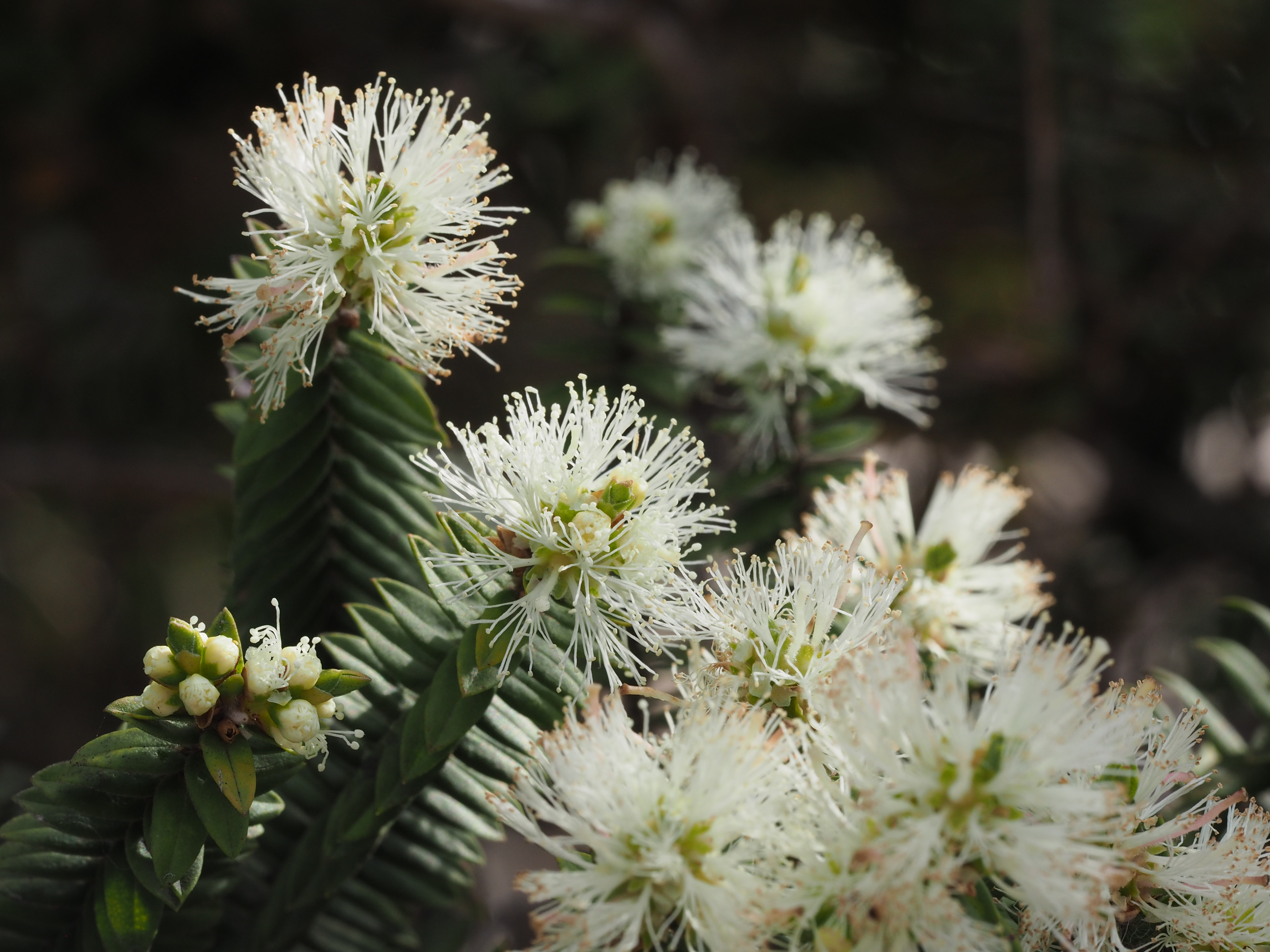
Flower detail

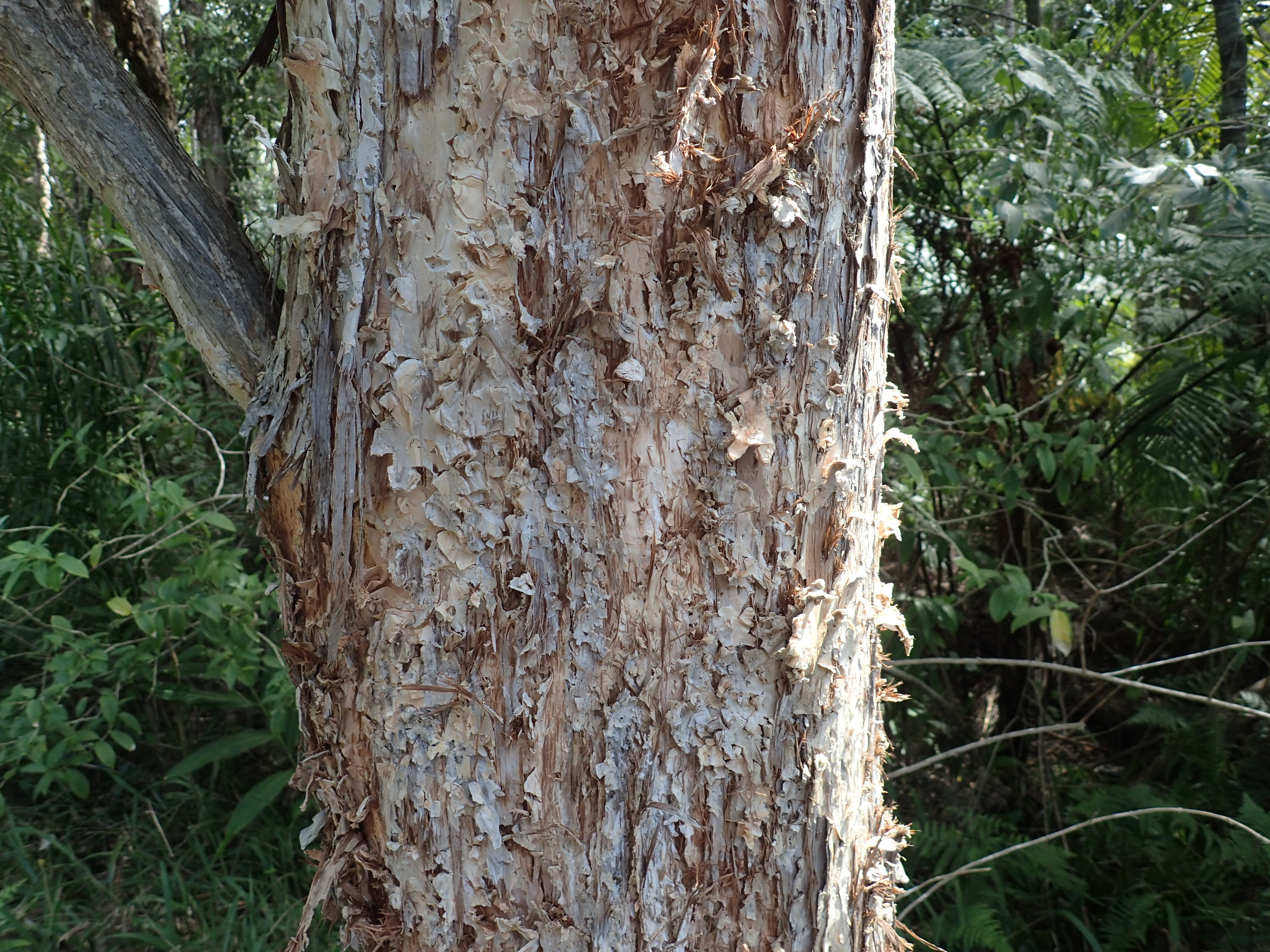
Bark
