= Bouddi National Park =

National park in New South Wales, Australia

- IUCN category II (national park)
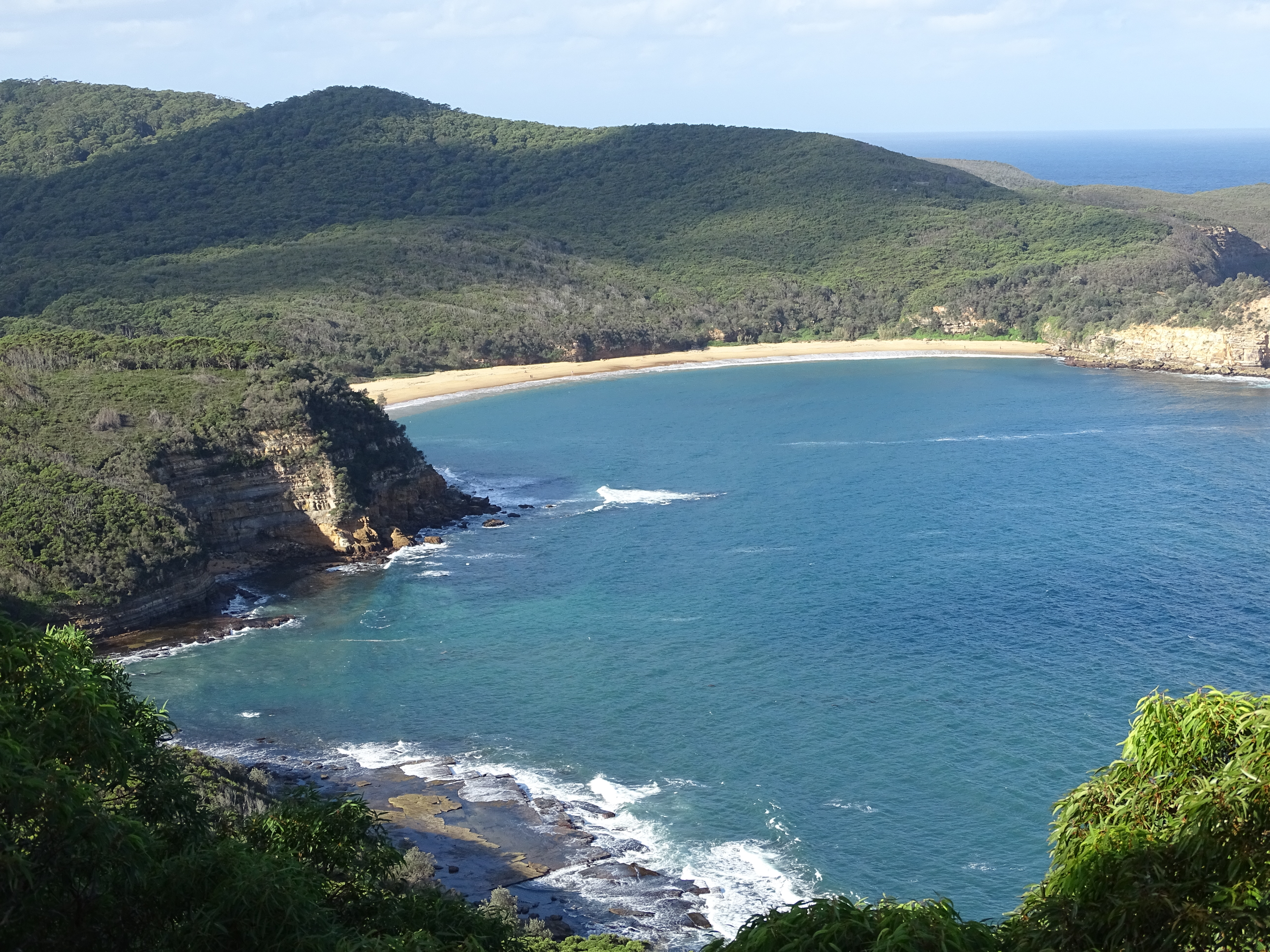
- The national park from the Bullimah Outlook

- Location within New South Wales
- Location: New South Wales
- Nearest city: Killcare
- Coordinates: 33°29′54″S 151°25′04″E
- Area: 15.32 km^{2} (5.92 sq mi)
- Established: 1 October 1967
- Governing body: NSW National Parks & Wildlife Service
- Website: https://web.archive.org/web/20141013202643/http://www.nationalparks.nsw.gov.au/Bouddi-National-Park

The Bouddi National Park is a coastal national park in the Central Coast region of New South Wales, in eastern Australia. The 1,532-hectare (3,790-acre) national park is situated 93 kilometres (58 mi) northeast of Sydney. A section of the national park extends into the Tasman Sea, creating fully protected land, shore and marine habitats. The park contains one of the last mature temperate rainforests on the Central Coast, Fletchers Glen.

== History ==
The Bouddi National Park was originally known as the Bouddi Natural Park. It received its name at the second meeting of the park trust held on 5 July 1936. Other names considered were Maitland Bay Park, Cape Three Points Reserve and Gerrinbombi Park. The reason for the choice was that Bouddi is the authenticated Aboriginal name of the most conspicuous feature of the district and appears on maps as early as 1828. Bouddi is an Indigenous word for the heart. The trust had been founded the year earlier to manage the reserve and had representation from the NSW Federation of Bushwalking Clubs and Erina Shire Council.

In 1967 the park, by then totalling about 1,310 acres (530 ha), was dedicated as a national park under the newly passed legislation and was renamed Bouddi State Park. Its management became the responsibility of the NSW National Parks and Wildlife Service, and soon afterwards the trust was reconstituted as an advisory committee. On 1 January 1974, the National Parks and Wildlife Act dispensed with the category of state parks and Bouddi was renamed Bouddi National Park.

== Geology and climate ==
The rocks underlying the Bouddi peninsula is primarily Hawkesbury sandstone. The coastal areas contain several examples of tessellated pavements and laterite plateaus. There are also significant examples of the Terrigal Formation.

== Biology ==
=== Flora ===
The Park contains three broad categories of vegetation: heath, Eucalyptus forest and grassy woodland.

=== Fauna ===
The park contains a wide diversity of animal life. A number of mammal species, including microbats, greater gliders and other marsupials are found in the Park. Reptile species present include lace monitors, green tree snakes and water dragons. Over 150 species of bird have been documented in the area.

The marine component of the Park has similarly high biodiversity. The marine extension of the park was found to have led to a 70% increase in fish numbers in the area than nearby comparators, and 60% higher numbers of species. A number of large mammals regularly frequent the area, including humpback whales, southern right whales and bottlenose and common dolphins. Leopard seals and fur seals have occasionally been seen on coastal rock platforms.

== Nearby national parks ==
The following national parks are within 50 km of Bouddi National Park:

- Brisbane Water National Park
- Ku-ring-gai Chase National Park
- Lane Cove National Park

== See also ==
- Protected areas of New South Wales
