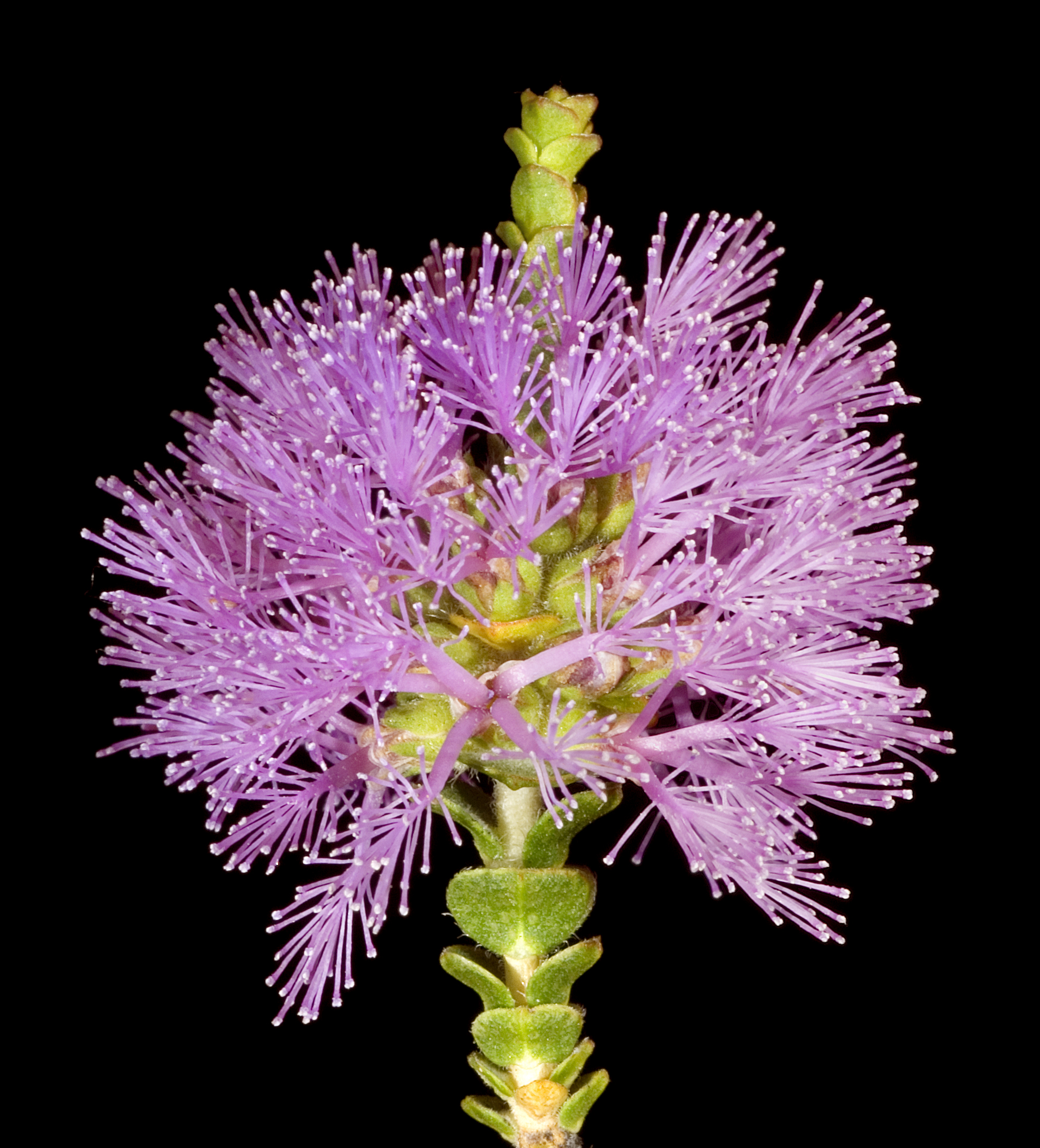

Scientific classification
- Kingdom: Plantae
- Clade: Tracheophytes
- Clade: Angiosperms
- Clade: Eudicots
- Clade: Rosids
- Order: Myrtales
- Family: Myrtaceae
- Genus: Regelia
- Species: R. ciliata

Binomial name
- Regelia ciliata Schauer

Synonyms
- Melaleuca crossota Craven & R.D.Edwards

= Regelia ciliata =

Species of shrub

Regelia ciliata is a plant in the myrtle family, Myrtaceae and is endemic to the south-west of Western Australia. It is a rigid, spreading shrub with paper-like bark on the stems, tiny wedge shaped leaves and dense heads of mauve flowers in spring and summer.

== Description ==
Regelia ciliata is rigid, spreading shrub which grows to a height of 1.3–1.5 m (4–5 ft). The leaves are arranged in alternating pairs (decussate) so that they make four rows along the stems. They are broadly egg-shaped, about 6 mm (0.24 in) long and 4 mm (0.16 in) wide and fringed with short hairs.

The flowers are mauve and arranged in dense heads 20–50 mm (0.8–2 in) across on the ends of branches which continue to grow after flowering. There are 5 sepals, 5 petals and 5 bundles of stamens. Flowering occurs over an extended period in spring and summer and is followed by fruit which are woody capsules in small, almost spherical clusters around the stem.

== Taxonomy and naming ==
Regelia ciliata was the first of its genus to be formally described. The description was written in 1843 by J.C.Schauer in the journal Linnaea: Ein Journal für die Botanik in ihrem ganzen Umfange. The specific epithet (ciliata) is derived from the Latin word cilium meaning "eyelash" in reference to the fringe of hairs on the leaves.

== Distribution and habitat ==
This regelia occurs in the Moore and Vasse River districts in the Avon Wheatbelt, Geraldton Sandplains, Jarrah Forest and Swan Coastal Plain biogeographic regions. It grows in sand in areas that are wet in winter.

== Ecology ==
Regelia ciliata is a shallow-rooted species, tolerant of water-logged soils. It occurs on the Gnangara Groundwater Mound but as water is removed from this mound to supply water for Perth, the populations of this species are in decline. A similar effect has been observed in Astartea fascicularis, Hypocalymma angustifolium and Pericalymma ellipticum.

== Conservation ==
Regelia ciliata is classified as "not threatened" by the Western Australian government department of parks and wildlife.

== Use in horticulture ==
Regelia ciliata is a hardy plant, especially compared to others in the genus and has been grown successfully in eastern Australia. It can be propagated from seed which is released from the fruit a few days after removal from the plant, or from cuttings taken in autumn. It will grow in full sun or partial shade and responds well to annual pruning and addition of fertiliser.
