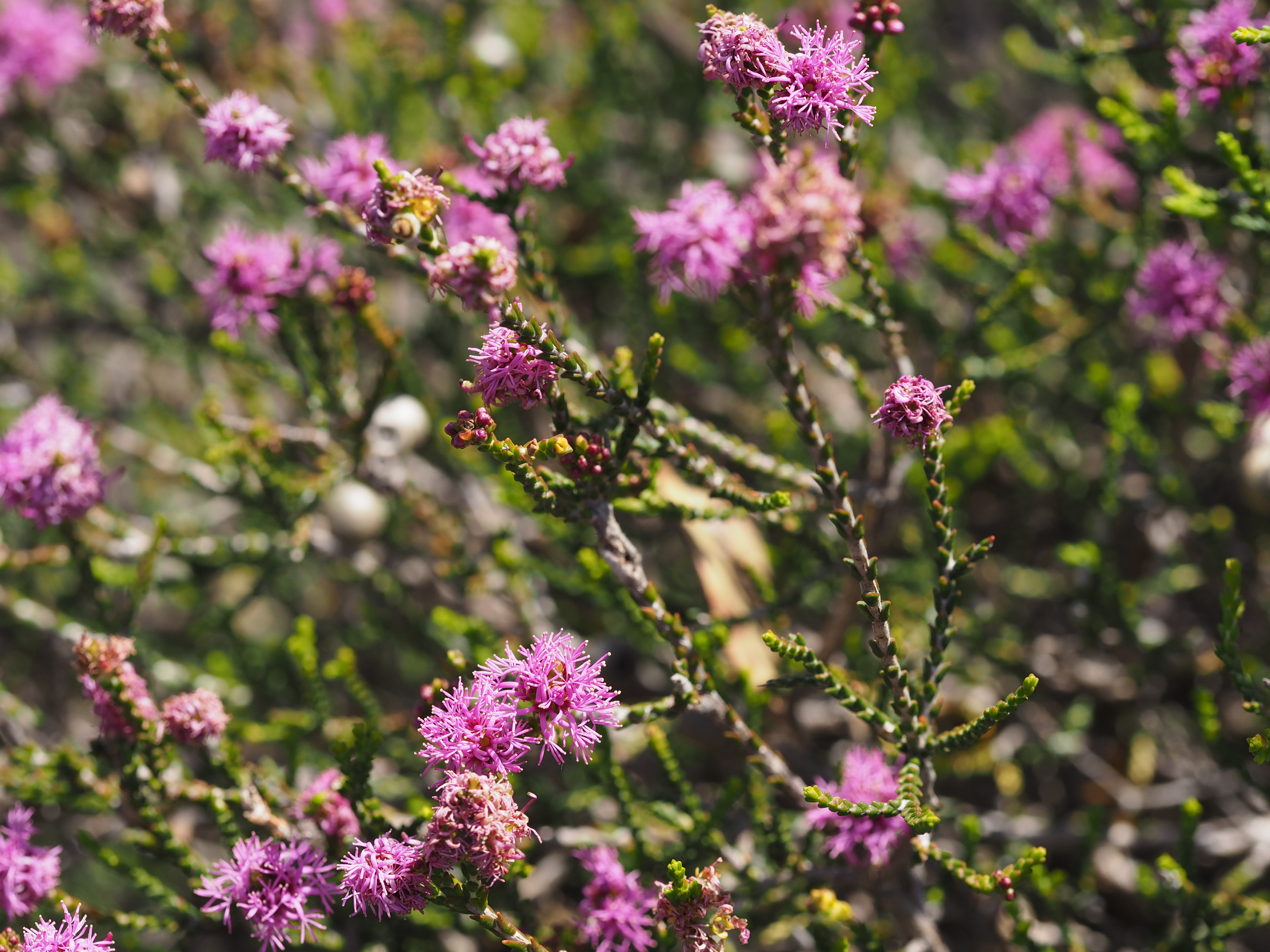
- Near Woogenellup in the Stirling Range area

Conservation status
- Priority Four — Rare Taxa (DEC)

Scientific classification
- Kingdom: Plantae
- Clade: Tracheophytes
- Clade: Angiosperms
- Clade: Eudicots
- Clade: Rosids
- Order: Myrtales
- Family: Myrtaceae
- Genus: Regelia
- Species: R. cymbifolia

Binomial name
- Regelia cymbifolia (Diels) C.A.Gardner

Synonyms
- Melaleuca cyathifolia Craven & R.D.Edwards

= Regelia cymbifolia =

Species of shrub

Regelia cymbifolia is a plant in the myrtle family, Myrtaceae and is endemic to the south-west of Western Australia. It is a much branched shrub bearing tiny, wedge shaped leaves and clusters of deep pink to purple flowers on the ends of its branches in spring.

== Description ==
Regelia cymbifolia is much branched shrub which grows to a height of 2 m (7 ft). The leaves are arranged in alternating pairs (decussate), so that they make four rows along the stems. They are egg-shaped, usually less than 4 mm (0.16 in) long, curved with their lower half pressed against the stem and have a prominent mid-vein.

The flowers are deep pink to purple and arranged in small clusters on the ends of branches that continue to grow after flowering. There are 5 sepals, 5 petals and 5 bundles of stamens. Flowering occurs between August and November and is followed by fruit which are woody capsules.

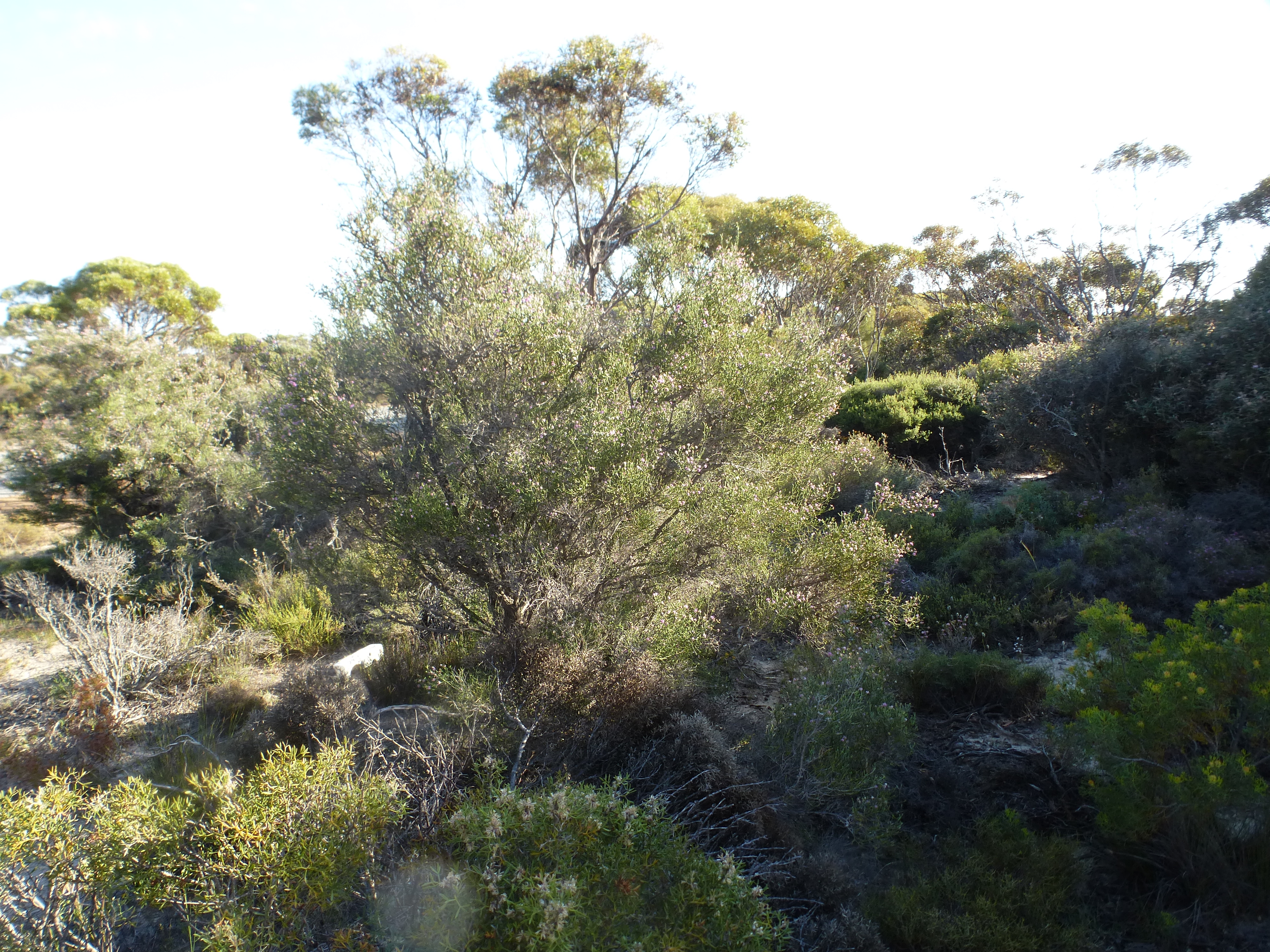
Habit

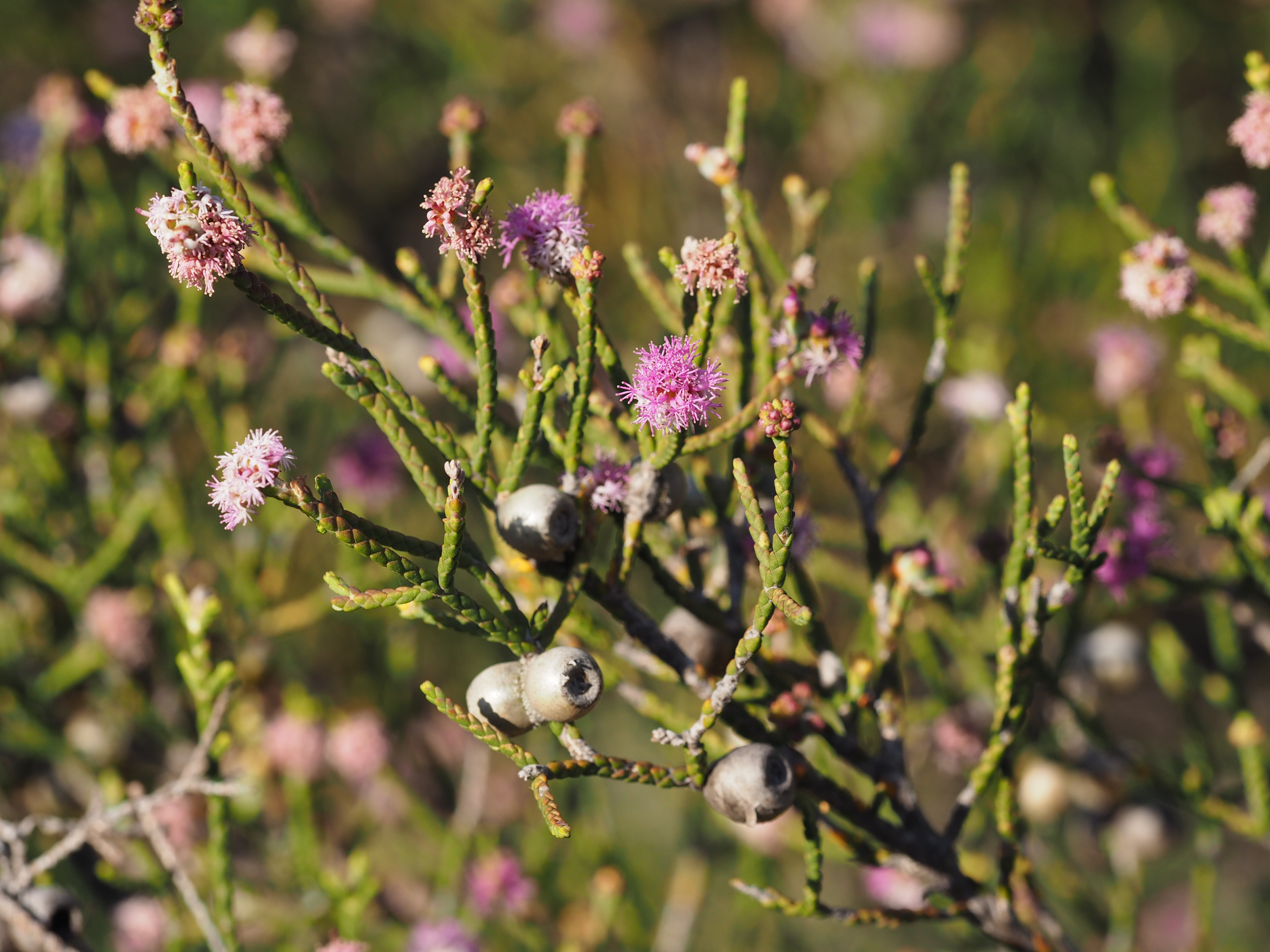
Fruit

== Taxonomy and naming ==
Regelia cymbifolia was first formally described in 1905 by Ludwig Diels in Botanische Jahrbücher für Systematik, Pflanzengeschichte und Pflanzengeographie and tentatively given the name Beaufortia ? cymbifolia. In 1964, Charles Gardner recognised the specimen as Regelia cymbifolia in Journal of the Royal Society of Western Australia. The specific epithet (cymbifolia) is from the Latin cymba meaning "a boat" and -folius meaning "leaved".

== Distribution and habitat ==
Regelia cymbifolia occurs in a restricted area near the Stirling Range in the Avon Wheatbelt, Esperance Plains and Jarrah Forest biogeographic regions. It grows in sand on undulating plains.

== Conservation ==
Regelia cymbifolia is classified as "Priority Four" by the Western Australian Government Department of Parks and Wildlife meaning that it is rare or near threatened.

== Use in horticulture ==
Regelia cymbifolia is not well known in cultivation but has been grown in Kings Park.
