= Norman Byrnes (botanist) =

Australian botanist

Norman Brice Byrnes (1922 – 1998) was an Australian botanist, specialising in taxonomy.

Byrnes was born in Adelaide on 18 December 1922. He served in the Australian Defence Force during World War II and following the war, in 1946 gained a Bachelor of Science from the University of Sydney.

Byrnes worked in Darwin in the Northern Territory from 1966 to 1973 then began at the Queensland Herbarium. He specialised in the families Combretaceae and Myrtaceae and his plant collections are stored in the Queensland and Northern Territory herbaria.

In 1986, Byrnes retired to live at Bingil Bay where he established an arboretum in Ross Overton Park at nearby Mission Beach and acted as coordinator for a local environment group called "C4". After his death, the arboretum was named the Norman Byrnes Arboretum in his honour.

He is the author of A revision of Combretaceae in Australia and of papers formally describing plants including Lophopetalum arnhemicum, Melaleuca biconvexa, Melaleuca punicea and Verticordia verticillata. The genus Neobyrnesia and plant species including Goodenia byrnesii and Grevillea byrnesii have been named in his honour.
