= Eremaea atala =

Scientific classification
- Kingdom: Plantae
- Clade: Tracheophytes
- Clade: Angiosperms
- Clade: Eudicots
- Clade: Rosids
- Order: Myrtales
- Family: Myrtaceae
- Genus: Eremaea
- Species: E. atala

Binomial name
- Eremaea atala Hnatiuk

Synonyms
- Melaleuca atala (Hnatiuk) Craven & R.D.Edwards

Species of flowering plant

Eremaea atala is a plant in the myrtle family, Myrtaceae and is endemic to the south-west of Western Australia. It is a small shrub with small, soft, non-prickly leaves, and purple flowers in late spring or summer. Flowers appear in groups of up to five usually on the ends of branches formed in the same year's growth.

== Description ==
Eremaea atala is a small, erect shrub with spreading branches, growing to a height of 1.2 metres (4 ft). The leaves are 7.3–10 millimetres (0.3–0.4 in) long, 0.8–1.5 millimetres (0.03–0.06 in) wide, flat, narrow egg-shaped with the narrower end towards the base and have a single vein visible on the lower surface. Unlike some others in the genus Eremaea, the leaves are soft and lack a prickly end.

The flowers are purple-coloured and arranged in groups of mostly three in the angles of the leaves, mostly along the current year's growth. There are 5 sepals which are densely hairy on the outside surface and 5 petals 3.2–4.5 millimetres (0.1–0.2 in) long. The stamens, which give the flower its colour, are arranged in 5 bundles, each containing 19 to 20 stamens. Flowering occurs from November to January and is followed by fruits which are woody capsules. The capsules are more or less cup-shaped, smooth and 5.0–5.5 millimetres (0.20–0.22 in) long.

== Taxonomy and naming ==
Eremaea atala was first formally described in 1993 by Roger Hnatiuk in Nuytsia. The specific epithet (atala) is from the Ancient Greek atalos meaning "soft" or "delicate" referring to the soft leaves of this species compared to those of the closely related Eremaea violacea and Eremaea hadra.

== Distribution and habitat ==
Eremaea atala is found between the Arrowsmith and Hill Rivers in the Geraldton Sandplains and Swan Coastal Plain biogeographic regions. It grows in sand over laterite.

== Conservation ==
Eremaea atala is classified as "not threatened" by the Western Australian Government Department of Parks and Wildlife.
