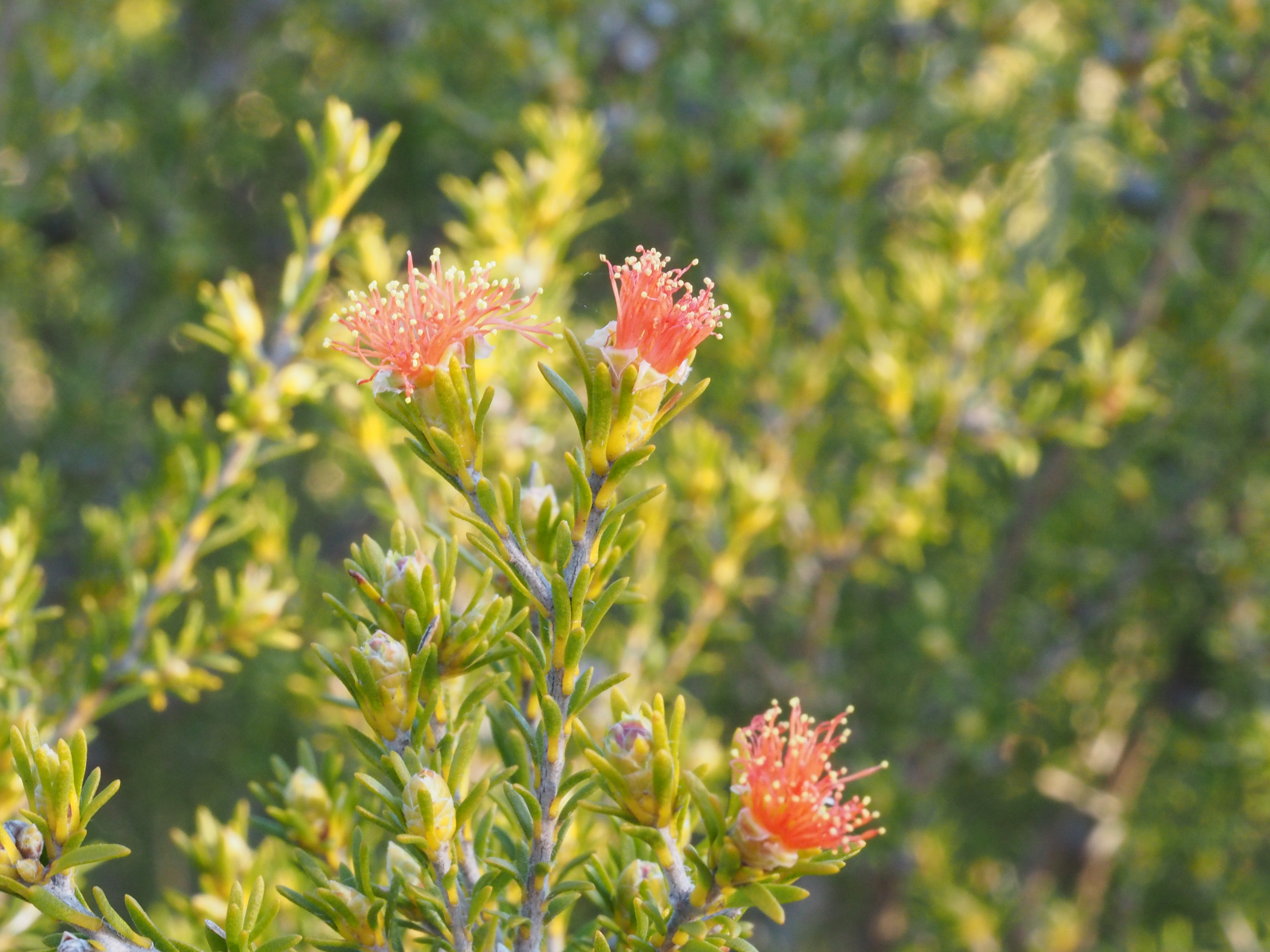
- E. pauciflora leaves and flowers

Scientific classification
- Kingdom: Plantae
- Clade: Tracheophytes
- Clade: Angiosperms
- Clade: Eudicots
- Clade: Rosids
- Order: Myrtales
- Family: Myrtaceae
- Genus: Eremaea
- Species: E. pauciflora

Binomial name
- Eremaea pauciflora (Endl.) Druce

Synonyms
- Melaleuca rariflora Craven & R.D.Edwards; Metrosideros pauciflora Endl.

= Eremaea pauciflora =

Species of flowering plant

Eremaea pauciflora is a plant in the myrtle family, Myrtaceae and is endemic to the south-west of Western Australia. It is a shrub with small leaves and orange flowers at the ends of its branches. It has the most widespread distribution of the eremaeas with considerable variation in its characteristics so that three varieties are recognised. It was the first Eremaea to be described formally but was not originally given the name Eremaea.

== Description ==
Eremaea pauciflora is an erect, spreading or densely foliaged and rounded shrub sometimes growing to a height of 2 metres (7 ft). The leaves are 2.9–7.9 millimetres (0.1–0.3 in) long, 0.6–3.3 millimetres (0.02–0.1 in) wide, linear to narrow egg-shaped with the narrower end towards the base. Sometimes one or 3 veins are visible on the lower surface.

The flowers are orange and are borne singly or in pairs on the ends of long branches which grew in the previous year. The flowers have 5 sepals which are densely hairy on the outside surface and there are 5 petals, 2.5–5.7 millimetres (0.1–0.2 in) long. The stamens are arranged in 5 bundles, each containing 17 to 47 stamens. Flowering occurs from July to January and is followed by fruits which are woody capsules. The capsules are 6–9.2 millimetres (0.2–0.4 in) long, smooth and variable in shape.

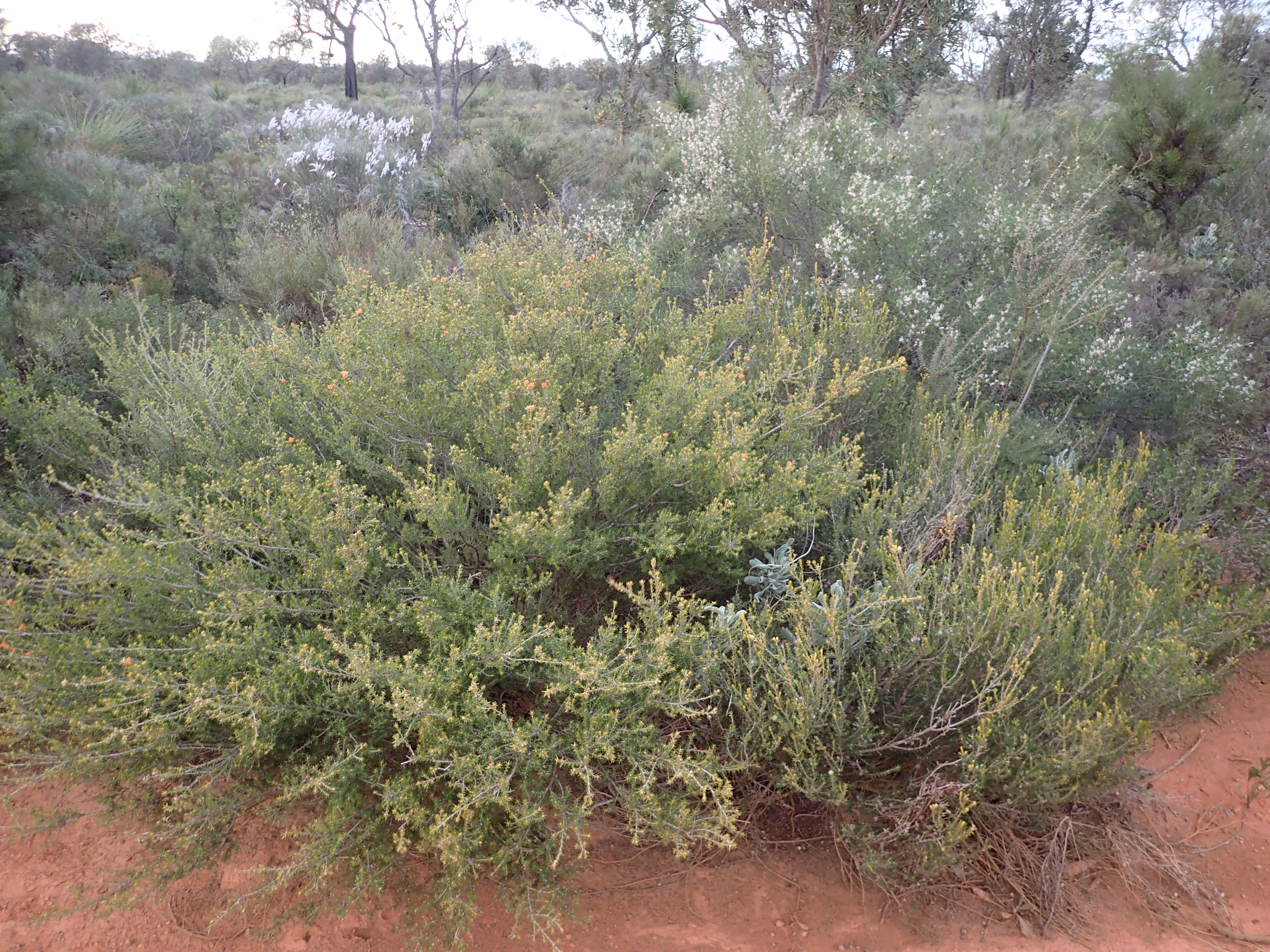
Near Regans Ford

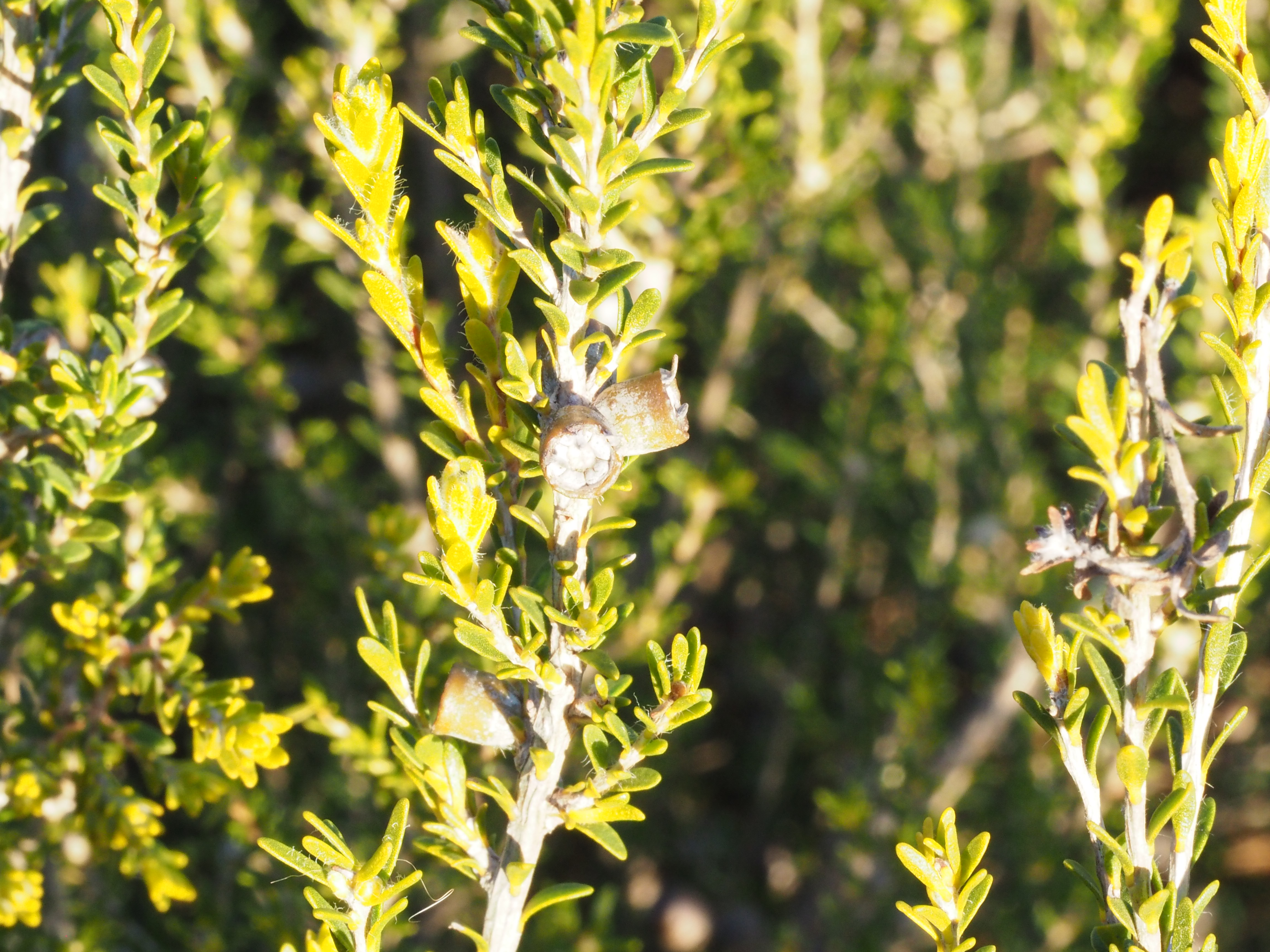
Fruit

== Taxonomy and naming ==
Eremaea pauciflora was originally known as Metrosideros pauciflora, having been formally described in 1837 by the Austrian botanist, Stephan Endlicher. The first species to be given the name Eremaea was Eremaea fimbriata, described in 1839 by John Lindley who noted "E. pilosa is probably the plant named Metrosideros pauciflora by Endlicher." Eremaea pauciflora was formally described in 1917 by George Claridge Druce.

The specific epithet (pauciflora) is derived from the Latin words paucus meaning "few" and flos, genitive floris, meaning "flower".

In 1998 Roger Hnatiuk described three varieties:

- Eremaea pauciflora (Endl.) Druce var. pauciflora has linear leaves with 1 vein, fruits that have a very narrow opening and ranges throughout most of the south-west as well as the drier Coolgardie biogeographic region;
- Eremaea pauciflora var. lonchophylla Hnatiuk has narrow elliptic leaves with 1 or 3 veins and occurs in near-coastal areas between Perth and Geraldton;
- Eremaea pauciflora var. calyptra Hnatiuk has linear leaves, cup-shaped fruit with a wide opening and occurs in near-coastal areas between Perth and Geraldton.

== Distribution and habitat ==
Eremaea pauciflora is found throughout the south-west region and its range extends into the more arid areas of Western Australia. It is found in a wide range of habitats in sand, sandy clay on plains, on slopes and in winter-wet depressions.

== Conservation ==
Eremaea pauciflora is classified as "not threatened" by the Western Australian Government Department of Parks and Wildlife.
