= Blackfriars Correspondence School =

Australian school

Blackfriars Correspondence School was an Australian school teaching children by correspondence.

== History ==
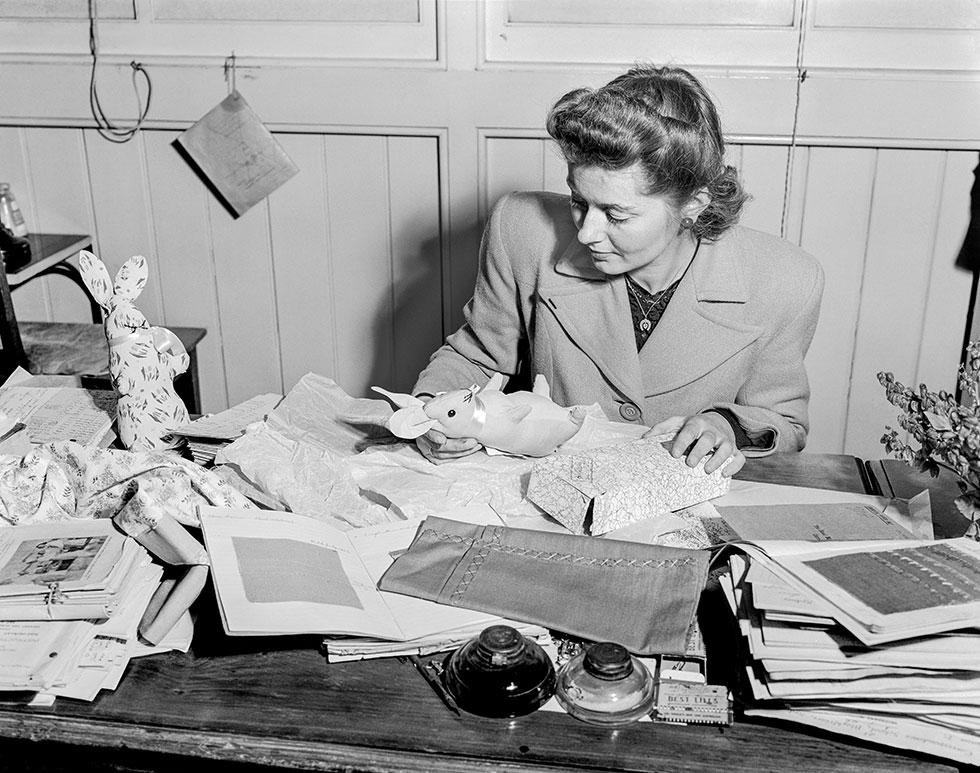
A teacher at Blackfriars Correspondence School checks the needlework sent in by children in her class (1946)

Blackfriars Correspondence School was opened in 1924. Although it is often claimed to be Australia's first correspondence school, others had existed as early as 1914.

For its headquarters, Blackfriars used the empty former building of Blackfriars Primary School in Chippendale, New South Wales.

The first Headmaster was WaIter Finigan. There were initially 27 students enrolled in the school's first year. At the end of 1924 there were almost 3,000 students. By 1931 there were 5,367 students and 96 staff at Blackfriars. This increased to over 7,000 students in 1936.

From the beginning, the school had few post-primary education opportunities and was run chiefly as a primary school. Maurice Kellerman was made Deputy Principal in July 1938 and then Headmaster in 1950 following the retirement of WaIter Finigan. Under his direction, the school was reorganised to better meet the needs of students and by 1951 had students enrolled in primary and secondary education by correspondence. His work led to the school becoming internationally known and their printed materials were imitated by other schools. Kellerman retired in 1964.

The increasing number of students led to the school purchasing a new building in William Street, Sydney with plans to relocate there in 1966 once renovations were completed. At the time, the secondary education department had already relocated there.

Many of the students were children living in isolated locations, primarily across New South Wales, but also beyond the state borders. Students were taught using printed leaflets, an annual magazine The Outpost, and radio programs broadcast by the ABC. The materials would follow the NSW syllabus and would mailed to students and returned again by mail.

Blackfriars was the subject of School in the Mailbox, a film made by the National Film Board in 1946.

The school was closed in December 1990. It was replaced the following year by 17 Distance Education Centres.

== Notable students ==
- Marion Blackwell, landscape architect and ecologist who recalled attending primary school through Blackfriars via radio
- Marie Coleman, social activist, public servant and journalist
- Jill Ker Conway, scholar
- Joan McClintock, social worker
- William O'Neil, professor of psychology
- James Rowland, Royal Australian Air Force chief and New South Wales governor
- Olga Lesle Symes, librarian
- Beth Williams, conservationist
- Judith Arundell Wright, poet
