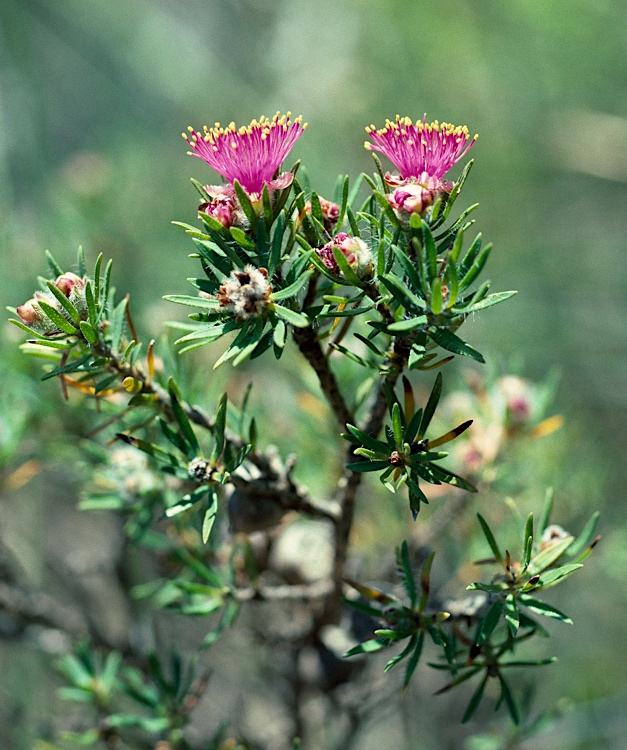
- Near Lesueur National Park

Scientific classification
- Kingdom: Plantae
- Clade: Tracheophytes
- Clade: Angiosperms
- Clade: Eudicots
- Clade: Rosids
- Order: Myrtales
- Family: Myrtaceae
- Genus: Eremaea
- Species: E. × codonocarpa

Binomial name
- Eremaea × codonocarpa Hnatiuk

Synonyms
- Melaleuca × codonocarpa (Hnatiuk) Craven & R.D.Edwards

= Eremaea × codonocarpa =

Species of flowering plant

Eremaea × codonocarpa is a plant in the myrtle family, Myrtaceae and is endemic to the south-west of Western Australia. It is thought to be a stabilised hybrid between two subspecies of Eremaea. It is a small shrub with triangular leaves and flowers a shade of pink to purple on the ends of the branches.

== Description ==
Eremaea × codonocarpa is a sometimes an erect shrub, sometimes prostrate, growing to a height of about 0.7 metres (2 ft). The leaves are 4.1–11.2 millimetres (0.2–0.4 in) long, 0.6–1.8 millimetres (0.02–0.07 in) wide, linear to narrow egg-shaped tapering to a point and more or less triangular in cross section. They have a covering of fine hairs and one, sometimes three veins on the lower surface.

The flowers are pink to deep pink and occur in small groups (usually pairs) on the end of short branches from longer ones formed the previous year. The outer surface of the flower cup (the hypanthium) is densely hairy. There are 5 petals 3.5–4.6 millimetres (0.1–0.2 in) long. The stamens, which give the flower its colour, are arranged in 5 bundles, each containing 19 to 26 stamens. Flowering occurs from October to November and is followed by fruits which are woody capsules. The capsules are more or less urn-shaped, 5.8–7 millimetres (0.23–0.28 in) long with a rough, flaky surface.

== Taxonomy and naming ==
Eremaea × codonocarpa was first formally described in 1993 by Nuytsia in the journal Nuytsia from a specimen found near Jurien Bay. Hnatiuk considers Eremaea × codonocarpa to be a stabilised hybrid between Eremaea asterocarpa subsp. asterocarpa and Eremaea violacea subsp. raphiophylla. That view is supported by isozyme studies. The name codonocarpa is derived from the Ancient Greek words κώδων (kódon) meaning “bell” and καρπός (karpós) meaning "fruit", alluding to the urn-shaped or bell-shaped fruits.

== Distribution and habitat ==
Eremaea × codonocarpa occurs in the Irwin district in the Geraldton Sandplains and Swan Coastal Plain biogeographic regions. It grows in sandy laterite on sandplains.

== Conservation ==
Eremaea × codonocarpa is classified as "not threatened" by the Western Australian Government Department of Parks and Wildlife.
