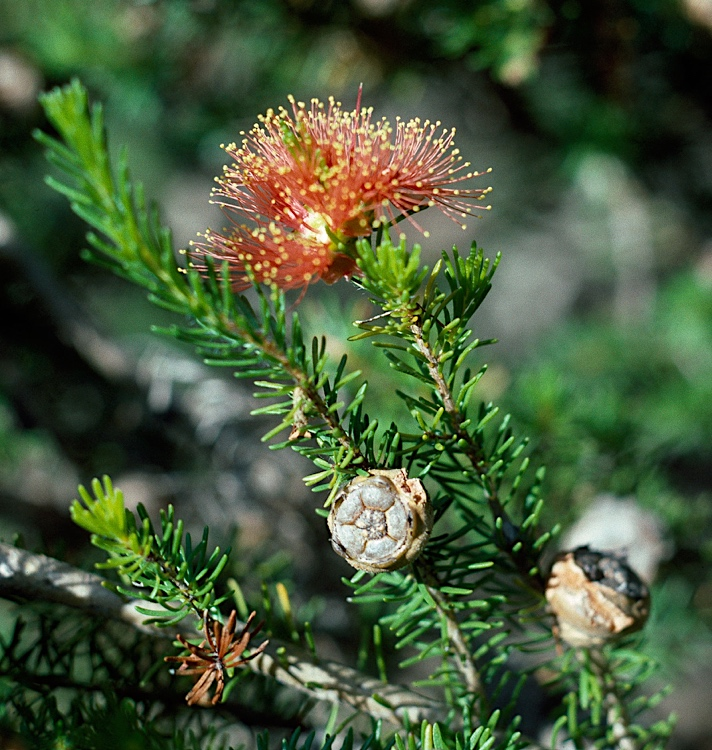
- In Kings Park, Perth

Scientific classification
- Kingdom: Plantae
- Clade: Tracheophytes
- Clade: Angiosperms
- Clade: Eudicots
- Clade: Rosids
- Order: Myrtales
- Family: Myrtaceae
- Genus: Eremaea
- Species: E. ebracteata

Binomial name
- Eremaea ebracteata F.Muell.

Synonyms
- Melaleuca ebracteata (F.Muell.) Craven & R.D.Edwards

= Eremaea ebracteata =

Species of flowering plant

Eremaea ebracteata is a plant in the myrtle family, Myrtaceae and is endemic to the south-west of Western Australia. It is a shrub with narrow, mostly linear leaves and which bears orange-coloured flowers on the long branches of the same season's growth. The fruits have a surface that is rough and lumpy.

== Description ==
Eremaea ebracteata is a shrub which grows to a height of about 1.0 metre (3 ft) and which has its younger branches densely covered with fine hairs. The leaves are linear to broad egg-shaped with the narrower end towards to base, 2.5–8.2 millimetres (0.1–0.3 in) long, 0.5–1.7 millimetres (0.02–0.07 in) wide and have a single prominent vein visible on the lower surface. (The two varieties differ mainly in leaf size and shape.)

The flowers are orange and are on the ends of long branches which grew earlier in the same season. The flowers occur singly, rarely two or three together. There are 5 sepals which are hairy on the outside surface and 5 petals 5.4–6.7 millimetres (0.2–0.3 in) long. The stamens are arranged in 5 bundles, each containing 40 to 60 stamens. Flowering occurs from November to December and is followed by fruits which are woody capsules. The capsules are 5.8–8.4 millimetres (0.2–0.3 in) long, 5.7–9.5 millimetres (0.2–0.4 in) long, cup shaped to almost spherical and are rough or lumpy on the outer surface.

== Taxonomy and naming ==
Eremaea ebracteata was first formally described in 1860 by Ferdinand von Mueller in his Fragmenta Phytographiae Australiae, from specimens collected by Augustus Oldfield near the Murchison River. The specific epithet (ebracteata) means "without bracts"

In 1993, Roger Hnatiuk described two varieties of E. ebracteata in the journal Nuytsia, and the names are accepted by the Australian Plant Census:

- Eremaea ebracteata F.Muell. var. ebracteata has linear leaves 4.5–8.2 millimetres (0.2–0.3 in) long, 0.5–1.0 millimetre (0.02–0.04 in) wide.
- Eremaea ebracteata var. brachyphylla Hnatiuk has elliptic or egg-shaped leaves 2.5–3.1 millimetres (0.098–0.12 in) long, 1.3–1.7 millimetres (0.05–0.07 in) wide.

== Distribution and habitat ==
Eremaea ebracteata is found in the Irwin district although var. ebracteata generally occurs in more northern parts of the range. It grows in sand or sandy loam on sandplains.

== Conservation ==
Both varieties of Eremaea ebracteata are classified as "not threatened" by the Western Australian Government Department of Biodiversity, Conservation and Attractions.
