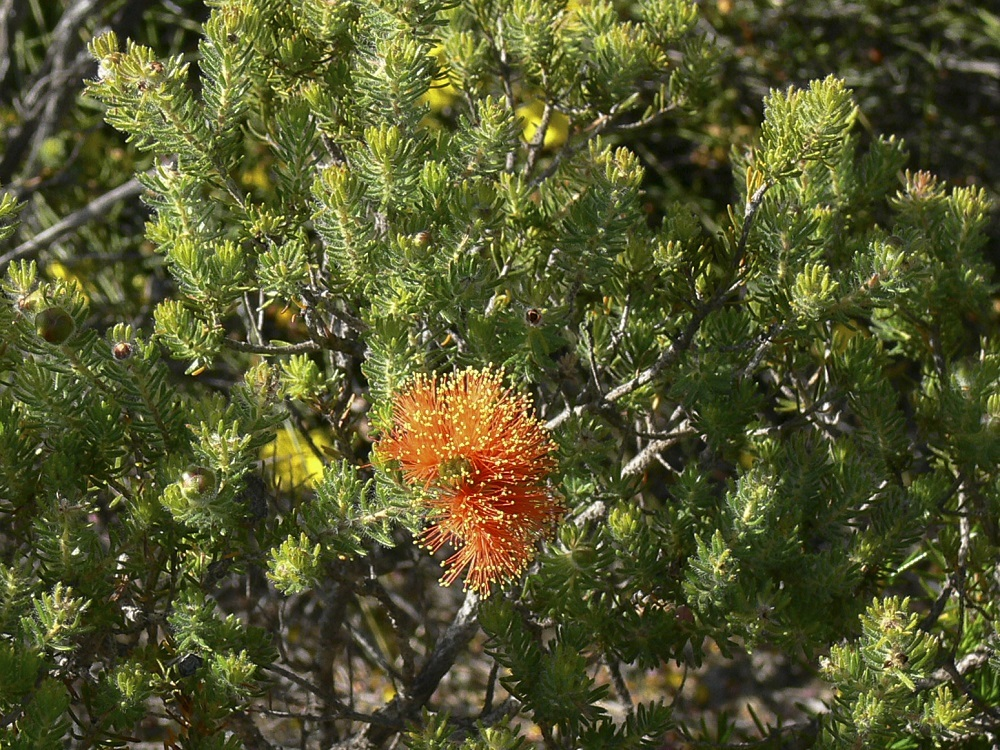

Conservation status
- Least Concern (IUCN 3.1)

Scientific classification
- Kingdom: Plantae
- Clade: Tracheophytes
- Clade: Angiosperms
- Clade: Eudicots
- Clade: Rosids
- Order: Myrtales
- Family: Myrtaceae
- Genus: Eremaea
- Species: E. dendroidea

Binomial name
- Eremaea dendroidea Hnatiuk

Synonyms
- Melaleuca dendroidea (Hnatiuk) Craven & R.D.Edwards

= Eremaea dendroidea =

Species of flowering plant

Eremaea dendroidea is a plant in the myrtle family, Myrtaceae and is endemic to the south-west of Western Australia. It is a small tree with small leaves and orange-coloured flowers on the ends of the branches in September. It has the most northerly distribution of all the eremaeas.

== Description ==
Eremaea dendroidea is a shrub or small tree, growing to a height of 3.5 metres (10 ft). Its branches point upwards from the main stem and the younger branches are densely covered with fine hairs. The leaves are 2.8–5.2 millimetres (0.1–0.2 in) long, 0.7–2.2 millimetres (0.03–0.09 in) wide, narrow elliptic or narrow egg-shaped, flat and glabrous. Sometimes there is a single vein visible on the lower surface.

The flowers are orange-coloured, on the ends of the long branches and occur singly or in pairs. There are 5 sepals which have a few hairs on the outside surface and 5 petals 3.0–4.4 millimetres (0.1–0.2 in) long. The stamens, which give the flower its colour, are arranged in 5 bundles, each containing 46 to 49 stamens. Flowering occurs in September and is followed by fruits which are woody capsules. The capsules are 5.0–8.6 millimetres (0.2–0.3 in) long, smooth on the outer surface and more or less cup-shaped. Unlike most others in the genus, the fruits of Eremaea dendroidea open and release the seeds when they are mature and are not retained in the fruit until the death of the plant.

== Taxonomy and naming ==
Eremaea dendroidea was first formally described in 1993 by Roger Hnatiuk in Nuytsia. The specific epithet (dendroidea) is from the Ancient Greek δένδρον (déndron) meaning "a tree" and εἶδος (eîdos) meaning "form" or "likeness" referring to the tree like growth form of this species.

== Distribution and habitat ==
Eremaea dendroidea is found in the northern part of the Irwin district, in the Carnarvon, Geraldton Sandplains and Yalgoo biogeographic regions. It grows in sandy soil on sand dunes, including near their crests.

== Conservation ==
Eremaea dendroidea is classified as "not threatened" by the Western Australian Government Department of Parks and Wildlife. The IUCN Red List assesses the species as Least Concern.
