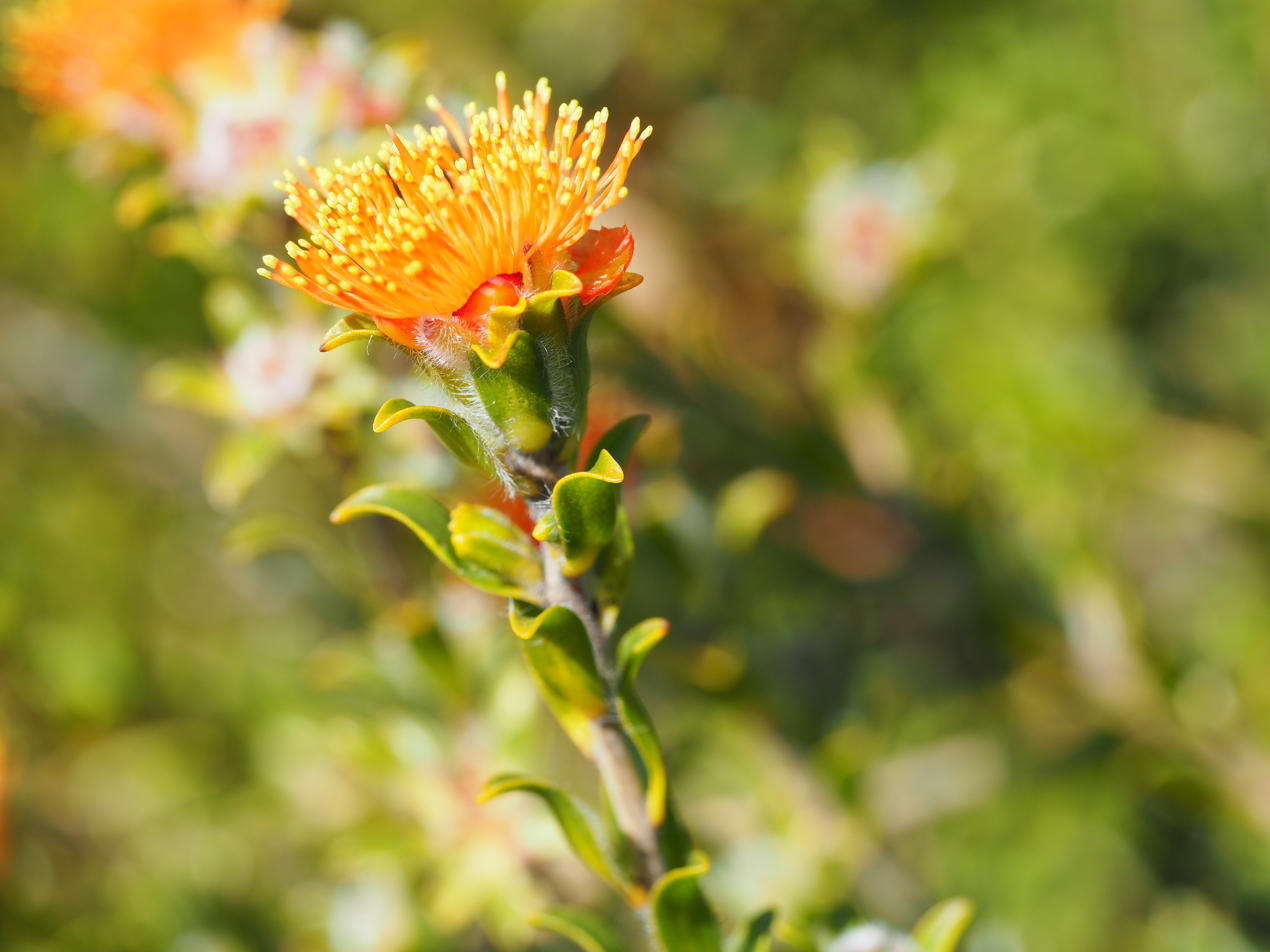
- Eremaea brevifolia flower, near the entrance to Lesueur National Park

Scientific classification
- Kingdom: Plantae
- Clade: Tracheophytes
- Clade: Angiosperms
- Clade: Eudicots
- Clade: Rosids
- Order: Myrtales
- Family: Myrtaceae
- Genus: Eremaea
- Species: E. brevifolia

Binomial name
- Eremaea brevifolia (Benth. Domin

Synonyms
- Eremaea fimbriata var. brevifolia Benth.

= Eremaea brevifolia =

Species of flowering plant

Eremaea brevifolia is a plant in the myrtle family, Myrtaceae and is endemic to the south-west of Western Australia. It is an erect, compact to spreading shrub with small, crowded leaves and orange-coloured flowers in early spring, followed by fruits with a rough outer surface.

== Description ==
Eremaea brevifolia is an erect, densely foliaged to spreading shrub which sometimes grows to a height of 2.2 metres (7 ft). The leaves are 4.5–7.2 millimetres (0.2–0.3 in) long, 3.3–5.8 millimetres (0.1–0.2 in) wide, flat, crowded and so that they overlap each other. They are broadly egg-shaped with the narrower end towards the base and have 5 to 9 veins visible on the lower surface.

The flowers are orange-coloured, 8–10 millimetres (0.3–0.4 in) across and (usually) occur singly on the end of short branches which grew the previous year. There are 5 sepals which are densely hairy on the outside surface and 5 petals, 3.8–6.8 millimetres (0.1–0.3 in) long. The stamens are arranged in 5 bundles, each containing 50 to 70 stamens. Flowering occurs from August to October and is followed by fruits which are woody capsules. The capsules are 7 millimetres (0.3 in) long, cup-shaped and are rough or lumpy on the outer surface. The leaves and fruits of this species are similar to those of Eremaea asterocarpa but the bracts surrounding the flowers are hairy.

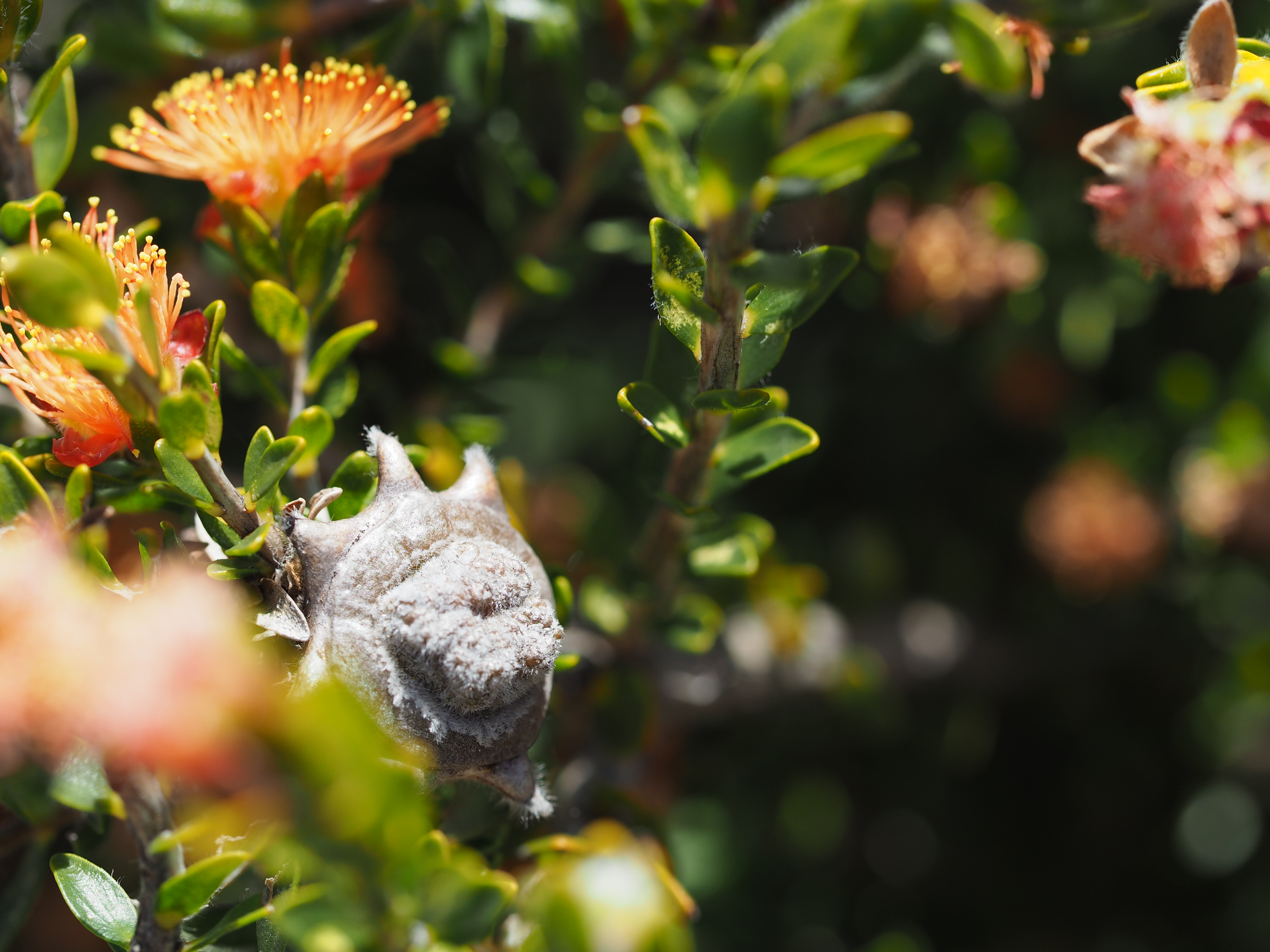
Eremaea brevifolia fruit

== Taxonomy and naming ==
Eremaea brevifolia was first formally described in 1923 by the Czech botanist Karel Domin in Vestnik Kralovske Ceske Spolecnosti Nauk, Trida Matematiko-Prirodevedecke. It had previously been known as a variety - Eremaea fimbriata var. brevifolia Benth. The specific epithet (brevifolia) is from the Latin brevis meaning "short" and folium meaning "a leaf" referring to the short leaves of this species compared to the subspecies now called Eremaea asterocarpa subsp. asterocarpa.

== Distribution and habitat ==
Eremaea brevifolia occurs in the Irwin district in the Geraldton Sandplains and Yalgoo biogeographic regions. It grows in sand or laterite on plains and rock outcrops.

== Conservation ==
Eremaea brevifolia is classified as "not threatened" by the Western Australian Government Department of Parks and Wildlife.
