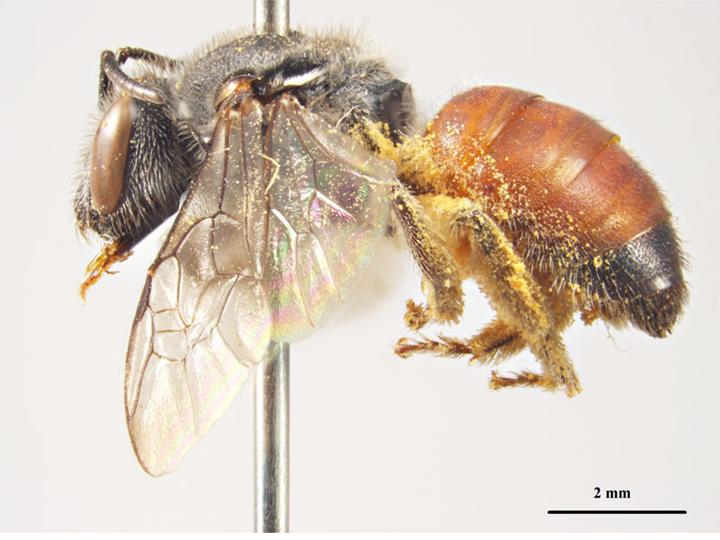
- Female

Scientific classification
- Kingdom: Animalia
- Phylum: Arthropoda
- Clade: Pancrustacea
- Class: Insecta
- Order: Hymenoptera
- Family: Halictidae
- Genus: Lasioglossum
- Species: L. lichatum

Binomial name
- Lasioglossum lichatum Smith, 1853

Synonyms
- Parasphecodes lichatus Smith, 1853

= Lasioglossum lichatum =

Species of bee

Lasioglossum lichatum, or Lasioglossum (Parasphecodes) lichatum, is a species of bee in the family Halictidae and subfamily Halictinae. It is endemic to Australia. It was described by English entomologist Frederick Smith in 1853.

== Distribution and habitat ==
The species occurs in Western Australia.

== Behaviour ==
The adults are flying mellivores. Flowering plants visited by the bees include Eremaea, Melaleuca, Verticordia and Grevillea species.

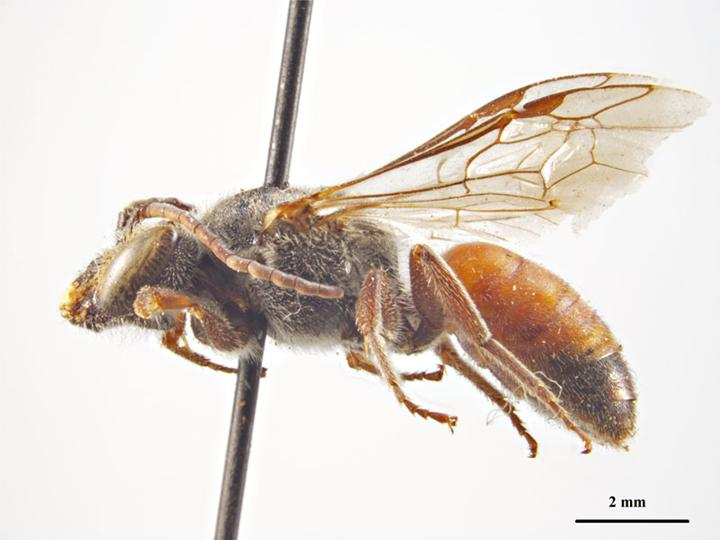
Male
