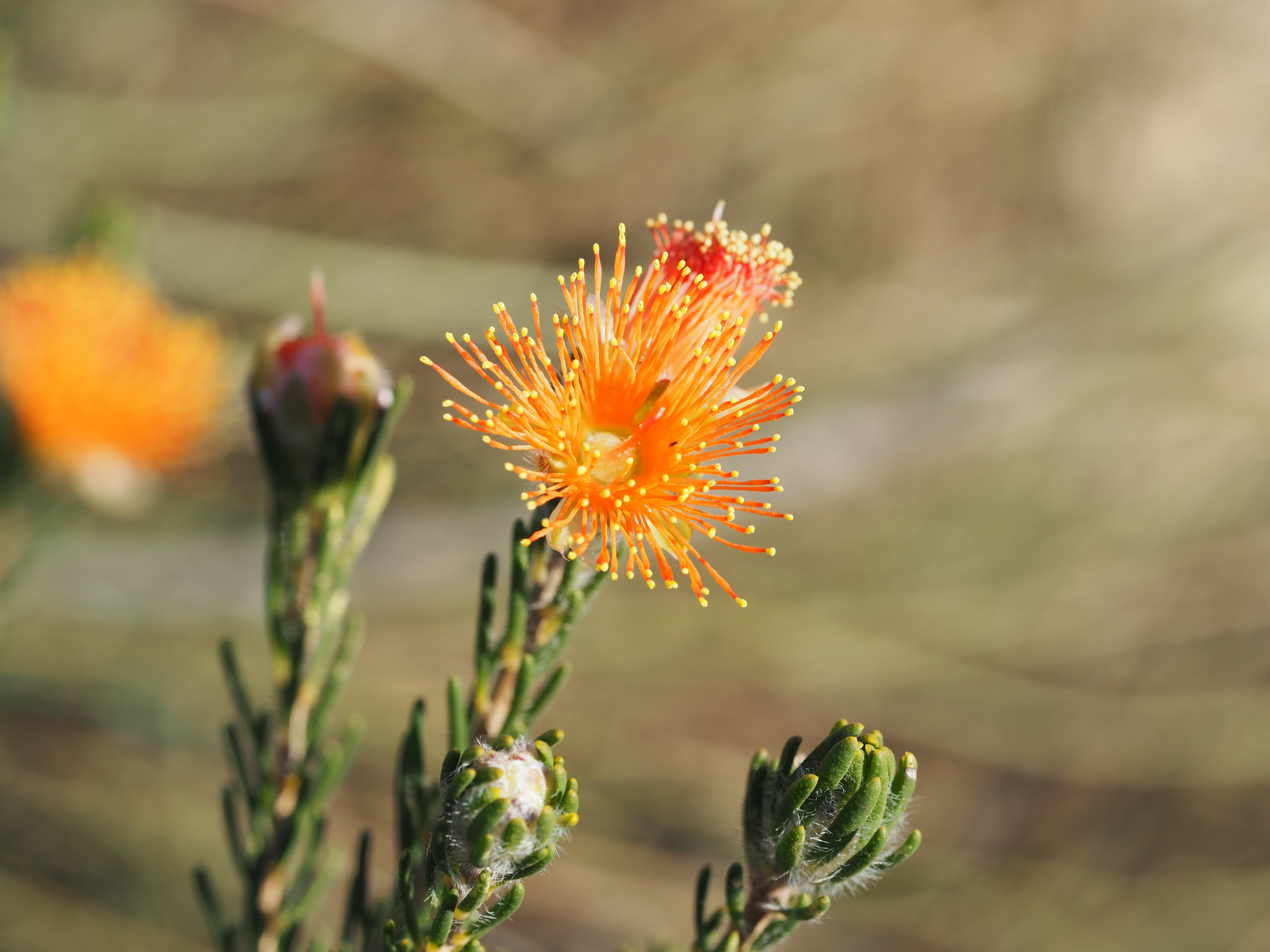
- Eremaea ectadioclada leaves and flower

Scientific classification
- Kingdom: Plantae
- Clade: Tracheophytes
- Clade: Angiosperms
- Clade: Eudicots
- Clade: Rosids
- Order: Myrtales
- Family: Myrtaceae
- Genus: Eremaea
- Species: E. ectadioclada

Binomial name
- Eremaea ectadioclada Hnatiuk

Synonyms
- Melaleuca ectadioclada (Hnatiuk) Craven & R.D.Edwards

= Eremaea ectadioclada =

Species of flowering plant

Eremaea ectadioclada is a plant in the myrtle family, Myrtaceae and is endemic to the south-west of Western Australia. It is a low, spreading shrub with small leaves, and orange-coloured flowers on the ends of the long branches which grew in the previous year.

== Description ==
Eremaea ectadioclada is a low, spreading shrub growing to a height of 0.7 metres (2 ft). Its younger branches are densely covered with fine hairs. The leaves are 4–10 millimetres (0.2–0.4 in) long, 0.4–2.0 millimetres (0.02–0.08 in) wide, narrow egg-shaped, tapering to a point. There is a single vein, sometimes three veins visible on the lower surface.

The flowers are orange-coloured and occur singly or (rarely) in pairs, on the ends of the longer branches which grew in the previous year. There are 5 sepals which are densely covered with hairs on the outside surface and 5 petals 4–6 millimetres (0.16–0.24 in) long. The stamens, which give the flower its colour, are arranged in 5 bundles, each containing 16 to 36 stamens. Flowering occurs from July to November and is followed by fruits which are woody capsules. The capsules are 6.9–8.0 millimetres (0.27–0.31 in) long, rough and scaly on the outer surface and more or less barrel-shaped or cup-shaped. This species can be distinguished from other eremaeas by its rough, usually star-shaped fruit and narrow leaves.

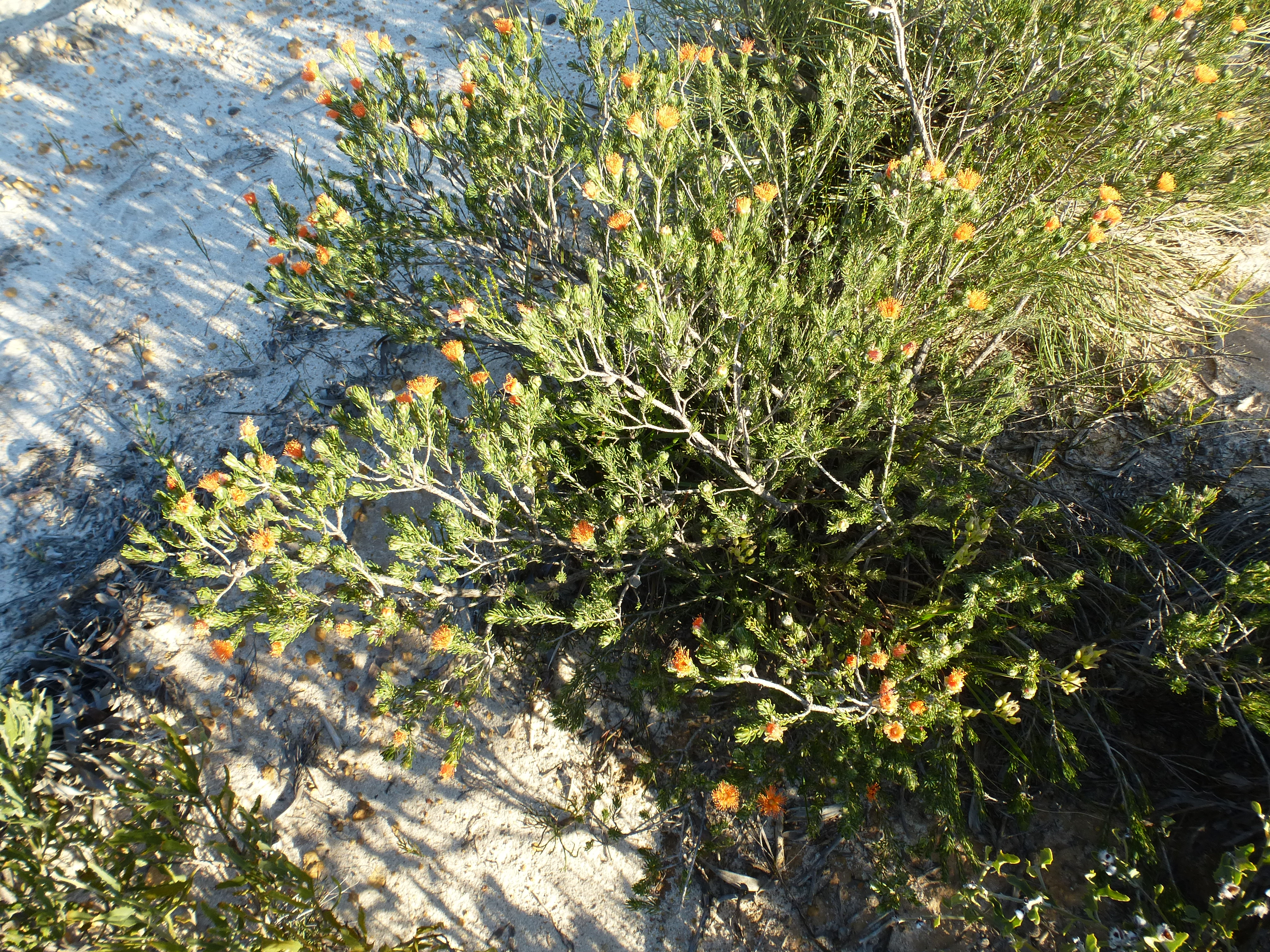
Habit near Badgingarra

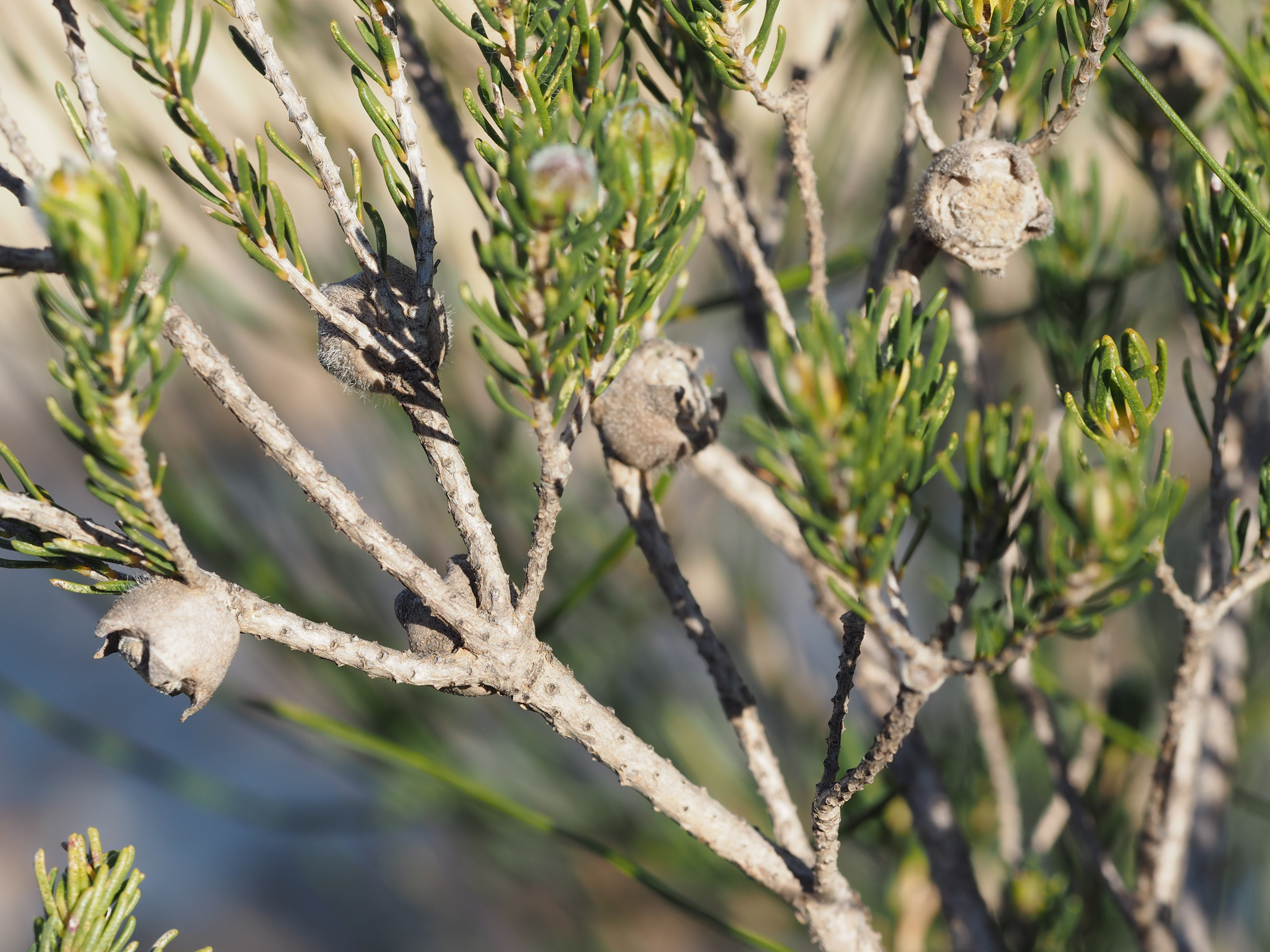
Fruit

== Taxonomy and naming ==
Eremaea ectadioclada was first formally described in 1993 by Roger Hnatiuk in Nuytsia. The specific epithet (ectadioclada) is from the Ancient Greek ektadios meaning "spreading" and klados meaning "branch" in reference to the growth form of this species.

== Distribution and habitat ==
Eremaea ectadioclada is found in near-coastal areas of the Irwin district between Eneabba and Jurien Bay in the Geraldton Sandplains biogeographic region. It grows in sandy soil over laterite on sandplains.

== Conservation ==
Eremaea ectadioclada is classified as "not threatened" by the Western Australian Government Department of Parks and Wildlife.
