= Eremaea × phoenicea =

Scientific classification
- Kingdom: Plantae
- Clade: Tracheophytes
- Clade: Angiosperms
- Clade: Eudicots
- Clade: Rosids
- Order: Myrtales
- Family: Myrtaceae
- Genus: Eremaea
- Species: E. × phoenicea

Binomial name
- Eremaea × phoenicea Hnatiuk

Synonyms
- Melaleuca × phoenicea (Hnatiuk) Craven & R.D.Edwards

Species of flowering plant

Eremaea × phoenicea is a plant in the myrtle family, Myrtaceae and is endemic to the south-west of Western Australia. It is thought to be a stabilised hybrid between two subspecies of Eremaea. It is an erect to spreading shrub with pointed, elliptic leaves and small groups of flowers, a shade of pink to red, on the ends of the branches.

== Description ==
Eremaea × phoenicea is an erect, sometimes spreading shrub growing to a height of about 1.5 metres (5 ft). The leaves are 4.2–6.8 millimetres (0.2–0.3 in) long, 0.8–1.7 millimetres (0.03–0.07 in) wide, narrow elliptic to egg-shaped with the narrower end towards the base and the other end tapering to a point. They have a covering of fine hairs and one, rarely three veins on the lower surface.

The flowers are rose-coloured to red and occur in groups of one to four on the end of branches formed the previous year. The outer surface of the flower cup (the hypanthium) is hairy and there are 5 petals 3.5–4.6 millimetres (0.1–0.2 in) long. The stamens, which give the flower its colour, are arranged in 5 bundles, each containing 19 to 26 stamens. Flowering occurs from October to November and is followed by fruits which are woody capsules. The capsules are more or less urn-shaped, 5.8–7 millimetres (0.2–0.3 in) long with a smooth surface.

== Taxonomy and naming ==
Eremaea × phoenicea was first formally described in 1993 by Nuytsia in Nuytsia (journal) from a specimen found near Eneabba. Hnatiuk considers Eremaea x phoenicea to be a stabilised hybrid between Eremaea beaufortioides and Eremaea violacea subsp. rhaphiophylla. That view is supported by isozyme studies.

The name phoenicea is derived from the Ancient Greek word φοῖνιξ (phoînix) meaning “purple” or "crimson" alluding to the flower colour of this species.

== Distribution and habitat ==
Eremaea × phoenicea occurs in the Irwin district in the Geraldton Sandplains biogeographic region where it grows in sand in kwongan and heath.

== Conservation ==
Eremaea × phoenicea is classified as "not threatened" by the Western Australian Government Department of Parks and Wildlife.
