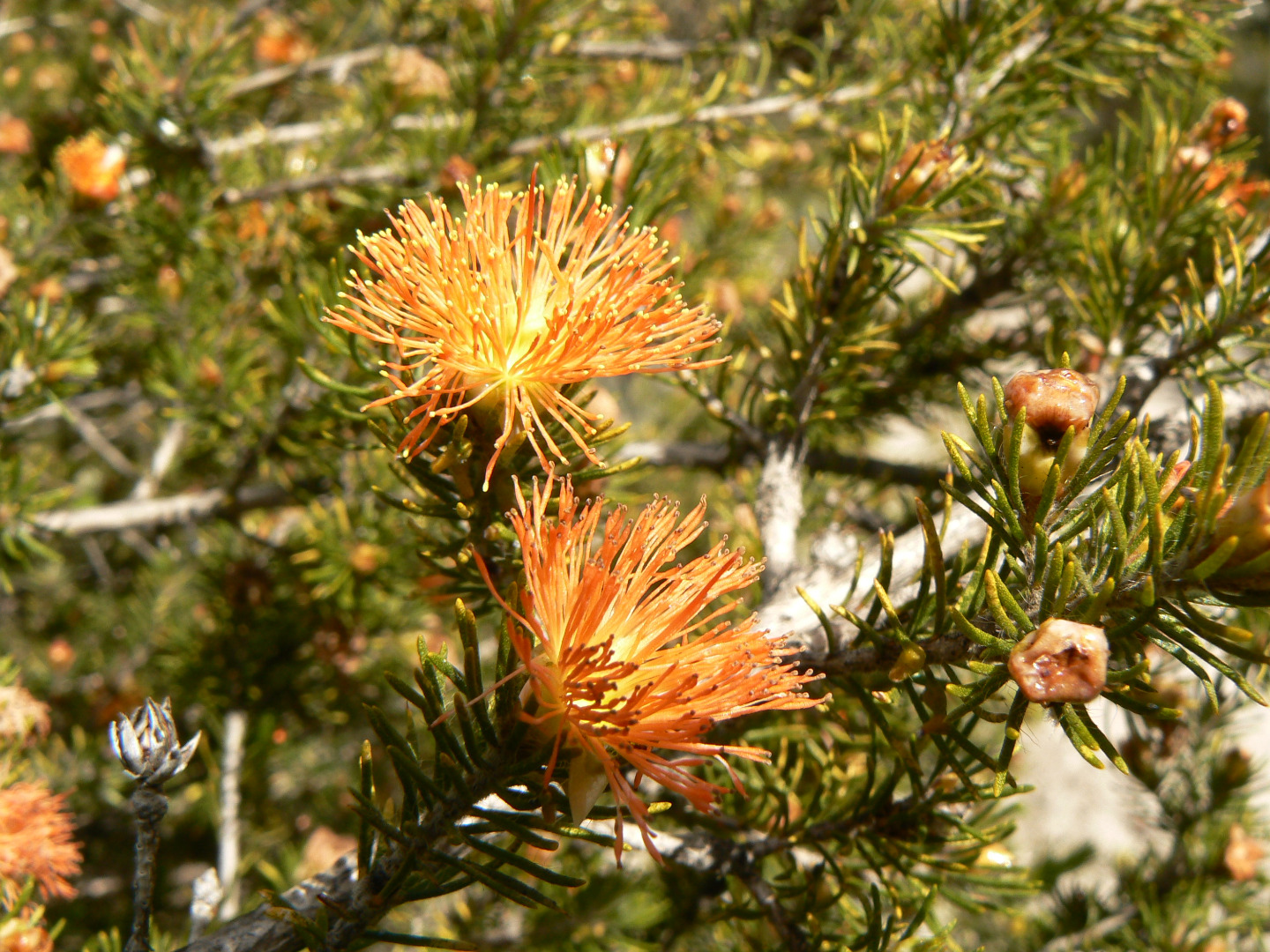
- Eremaea blackwelliana growing near Northam

Conservation status
- Priority Four — Rare Taxa (DEC)

Scientific classification
- Kingdom: Plantae
- Clade: Tracheophytes
- Clade: Angiosperms
- Clade: Eudicots
- Clade: Rosids
- Order: Myrtales
- Family: Myrtaceae
- Genus: Eremaea
- Species: E. blackwelliana

Binomial name
- Eremaea blackwelliana Hnatiuk

Synonyms
- Melaleuca blackwelliana (Hnatiuk) Craven & R.D.Edwards

= Eremaea blackwelliana =

Species of flowering plant

Eremaea blackwelliana is a plant in the myrtle family, Myrtaceae and is endemic to the south-west of Western Australia. It is a shrub with soft, pointed, non-prickly leaves, orange flowers in spring and cup shaped to almost spherical woody fruits. Flowers appear singly on the ends of short side branches formed in the previous year.

== Description ==
Eremaea blackwelliana is a shrub with spreading branches, growing to about 3 metres (10 ft) high and wide. The leaves are 8.8–9.7 millimetres (0.3–0.4 in) long, 0.6–0.9 millimetres (0.02–0.04 in) wide, linear, pointed but not sharp and are thickened along the mid-line.

The flowers are orange-coloured and occur singly on the end of branches formed the previous year. The outer surface of the flower cup (the hypanthium) is densely hairy. There are 5 petals 3.2–4.5 millimetres (0.1–0.2 in) long. The stamens, which give the flower its colour, are arranged in 5 bundles, each containing 20 to 26 stamens. Flowering occurs from October to November and is followed by fruits which are woody capsules. The capsules are more or less cup-shaped to spherical, smooth and 7.5–8.1 millimetres (0.30–0.32 in) long.

== Taxonomy and naming ==
Eremaea blackwelliana was first formally described in 1993 by Roger Hnatiuk in Nuytsia. The specific epithet (blackwelliana) honours Marion Blackwell, a landscape designer who encouraged the cultivation of Australian native plants.

== Distribution and habitat ==
Eremaea blackwelliana is found in the Avon district in the Avon Wheatbelt and Jarrah Forest biogeographic regions. It grows in sand in gently sloping depressions.

== Conservation ==
Eremaea blackwelliana is listed as "Priority 4" by the Western Australian Government Department of Parks and Wildlife meaning that it is rare or near threatened.
