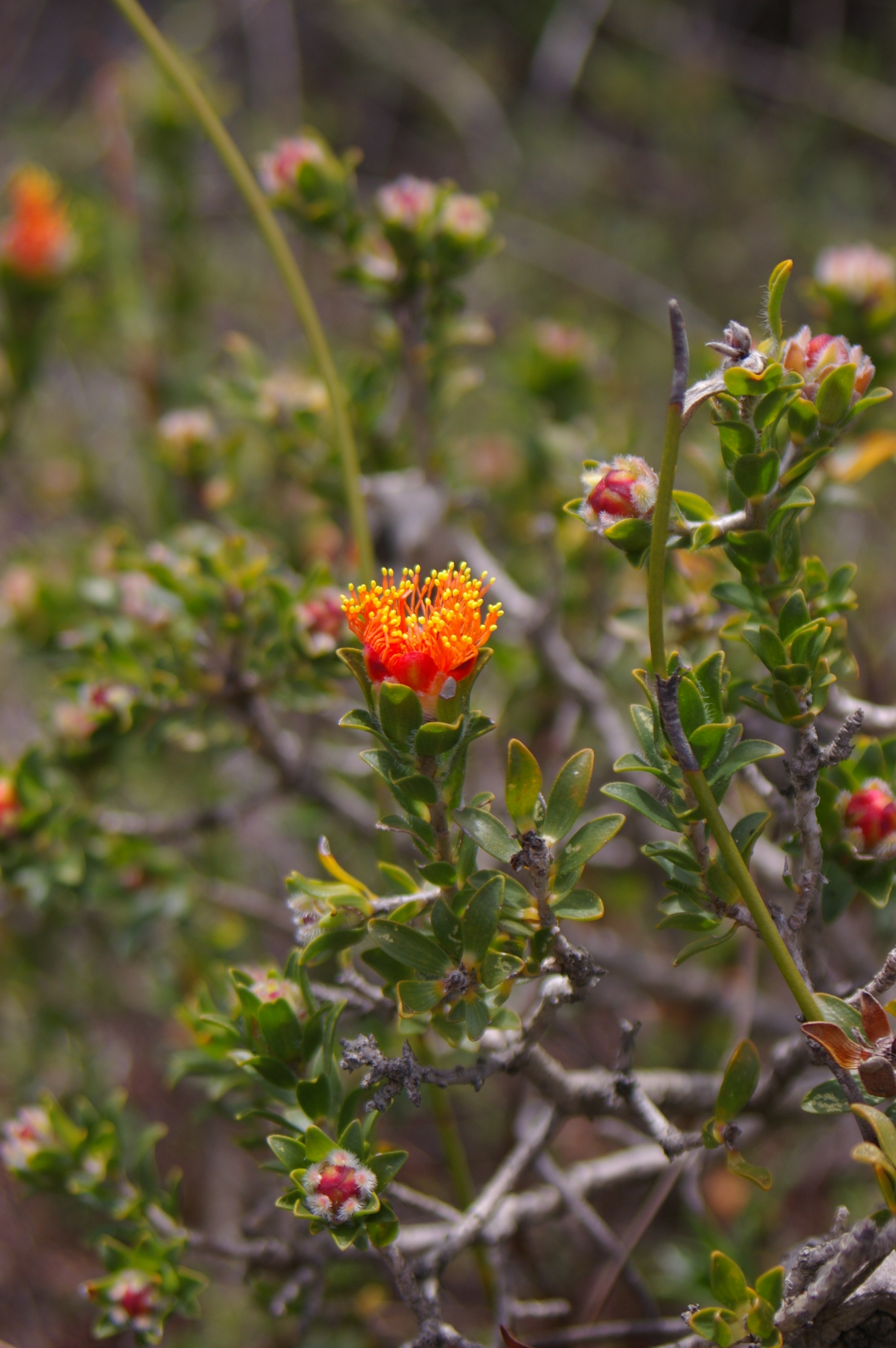
- Eremaea asterocarpa

Scientific classification
- Kingdom: Plantae
- Clade: Tracheophytes
- Clade: Angiosperms
- Clade: Eudicots
- Clade: Rosids
- Order: Myrtales
- Family: Myrtaceae
- Subfamily: Myrtoideae
- Tribe: Melaleuceae
- Genus: Eremaea; Lindl.

Synonyms
- Eremaeopsis Kuntze

= Eremaea (plant) =

Genus of flowering plants

Eremaea is a genus of woody shrubs and small trees in the family Myrtaceae and is endemic to the south-west of Western Australia. Little study of the genus as a whole had been undertaken until Roger Hnatiuk researched Eremaea and published a paper in 1993, A revision of the genus Eremaea (Myrtaceae) in Nuytsia. The first species to be described was Eremaea pauciflora (as Metrosideros pauciflora) in 1837 and by 1964, the number of species known had increased to 12. Hnatiuk recognised 16 species, 5 subspecies and a number of varieties.

== Description ==
Plants in the genus Eremaea are shrubs or small trees with small leaves that are arranged alternately on the stem and are dotted with oil glands. The flowers have both male and female parts and are solitary or in clusters of two or three on the ends of the branches. There are 5 sepals, and 5 petals which fall off as the flower matures. There are many stamens, all longer than the petals and usually arranged in groups of five. The stamens give the flowers their colour, which may be pink, deep pink, orange or violet. The fruit is a woody capsule containing one to six small seeds.

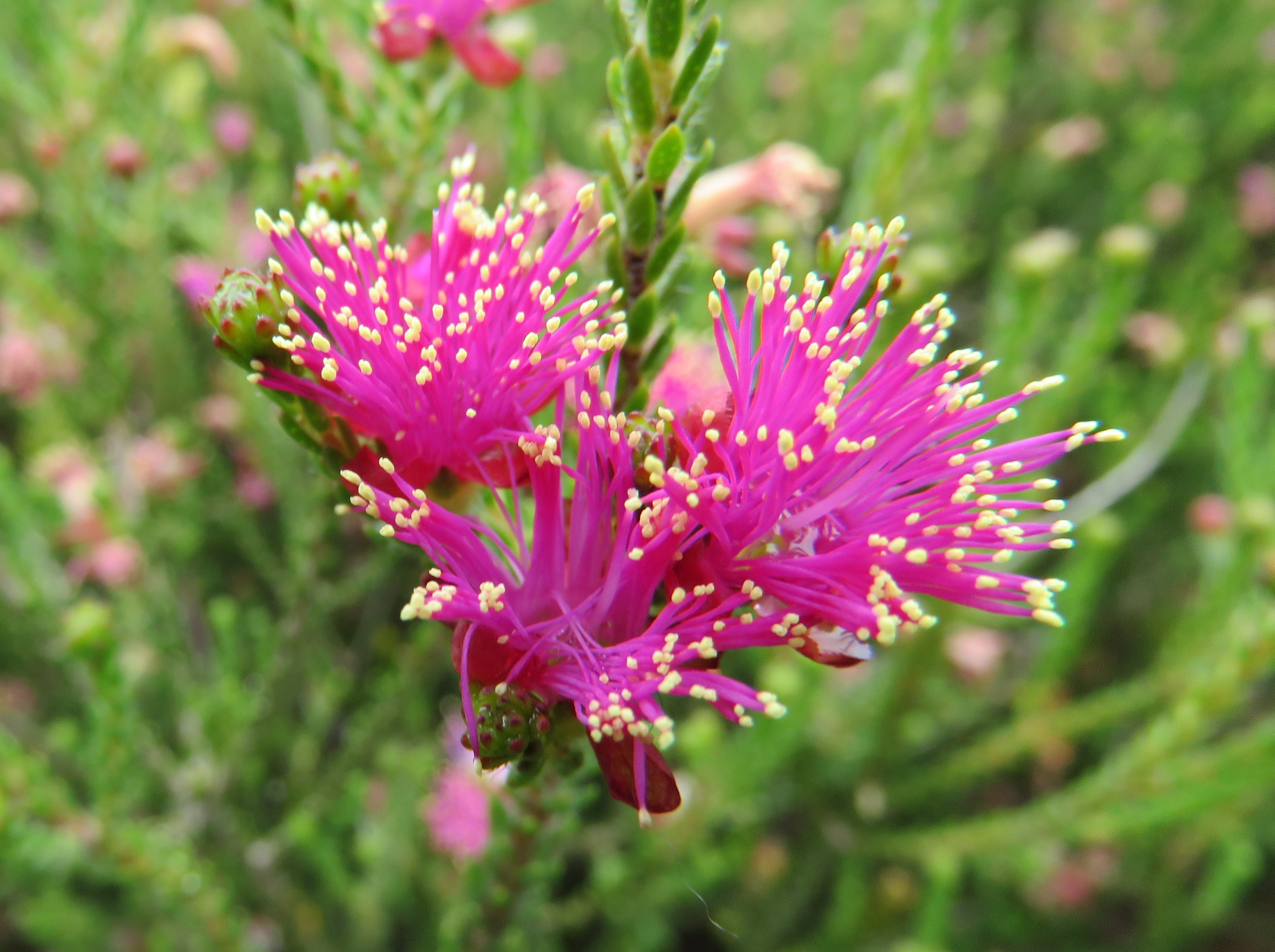
Eremaea fimbriata

== Taxonomy and naming ==
The genus Eremaea was first named and formally described in 1839 by John Lindley in A Sketch of the Vegetation of the Swan River Colony in which he noted "Of this genus, which may be called Eremaea ... there are three species, of which the only pretty kind is E. fimbriata." (The species now known as Eremaea pauciflora had been described earlier but given the name Metrosideros pauciflora.)

The genus Eremaea is closely related to Melaleuca, Beaufortia Regelia and several others, differing mainly in the way the anthers are attached to the stalks of the stamens, and in the way they open to release their pollen. Eremaea is most closely related to Regelia and Calothamnus as these groups have anthers that open by longitudinal slits or pores. Eremaea can be distinguished from Regelia by the number of flowers in the flowering heads - in Regelia the flowers are in dense heads, whereas in Eremaea they are solitary or in groups of two or three. Calothamnus species have longer leaves than both of these genera. In 2014, Lyndley Craven and others proposed, mainly on the basis of DNA evidence, that species in the genus Eremaea, along with those in Beaufortia, Conothamnus, Calothamnus, Lamarchea, Petraeomyrtus, Phymatocarpus and Regelia be transferred to Melaleuca.

The name Eremaea is from a poetic Greek word eremaios meaning "solitary", referring to the few-flowered inflorescences on the ends of the branches.

== Distribution and habitat ==
Fifteen of the sixteen species of Eremaea occur only in the South West Botanical Province of Western Australia. (Eremaea pauciflora also occurs in the Eremaean province.) They are a significant part of the shrub layer in these areas.

== Ecology ==
Species in the genus Eremaea can recover from fire by reseeding when the plant is killed and the fruits open and release their seeds. Some species also form a lignotuber so that well-established plants can resprout after fire.

== Conservation ==
Some species of Eremaea are common within their range but several, including Eremaea violacea subsp. Dobaderry Swamp, are listed as "Priority One" by the Western Australian Government Department of Parks and Wildlife meaning that they are known from only one or a few locations which are potentially at risk. No species has been declared rare.

== Use in cultivation ==
Some species of Eremaea have been grown in cultivation but with varying success. Eremaea beaufortioides has grown well in sunny situations with excellent drainage producing a vigorous, spreading shrub. Grafting onto Kunzea ambigua has been successful. Some other species grow well in Kings Park but are rarely seen in the eastern states. Their orange colour, not common in Australian natives, and their habit of having flowers on the ends of their branches make them worthy garden subjects.

== Species list ==
The following is a list of the species of Eremaea as described by Roger Hnatiuk and recognised by the Western Australian Herbarium:

- Eremaea acutifolia F.Muell. – rusty eremaea
- Eremaea asterocarpa Hnatiuk
- Eremaea atala Hnatiuk
- Eremaea beaufortioides Benth.
- Eremaea blackwelliana Hnatiuk
- Eremaea brevifolia (Benth.) Domin
- Eremaea × codonocarpa Hnatiuk
- Eremaea dendroidea Hnatiuk
- Eremaea ebracteata F.Muell.
- Eremaea ectadioclada Hnatiuk
- Eremaea fimbriata Lindl.
- Eremaea hadra Hnatiuk
- Eremaea pauciflora (Endl.) Druce
- Eremaea × phoenicea Hnatiuk
- Eremaea purpurea C.A.Gardner
- Eremaea violacea F.Muell. – violet eremaea
