= Thelotrema hnatiukii =

Scientific classification
- Kingdom: Fungi
- Division: Ascomycota
- Class: Lecanoromycetes
- Order: Graphidales
- Family: Graphidaceae
- Genus: Thelotrema
- Species: T. hnatiukii

Binomial name
- Thelotrema hnatiukii Sipman (2010)

Species of lichen-forming fungus

Thelotrema hnatiukii is a species of crustose lichen in the family Graphidaceae. It grows on tree bark on Aldabra (Seychelles) and has a pale grey thallus that lies mostly within the outer bark (endophloeodic), so the lichen can be easy to miss. The round fruiting bodies (ascocarps) are 0.5–0.8 mm across, with a slightly raised margin around a pore 0.2–0.5 mm wide; when dry, the brown rim tissue (proper exciple) is often visible through the opening (ostiole). Each ascus contains eight colourless ascospores that are somewhat muriform (partitioned into internal compartments) and measure about 12 × 9 to 17 × 7 μm; most spores have 4–6 main cross-walls, and some segments are also split lengthwise. The thallus contains stictic acid and turns yellow when tested with potassium hydroxide solution (the K test).

The species was described in 2010 by Harrie Sipman from material collected in 1973 by Roger Hnatiuk. The holotype came from Cinque Cases, where it grew on Polysphaeria multiflora in dense shrubland about 1.3 km from the shore; additional specimens were found on Ficus reflexa and Terminalia boivinii. It closely resembles Thelotrema euphorbiae, but differs in having submuriform (rather than strongly septate) spores and a brownish proper exciple. Sipman named the lichen in honour of Hnatiuk, whose collecting revealed this inconspicuous species. It is known only from Aldabra, though Sipman suggested it may be more widespread in maritime woodland in the western Indian Ocean.
