= Lamarchea hakeifolia =

Scientific classification
- Kingdom: Plantae
- Clade: Tracheophytes
- Clade: Angiosperms
- Clade: Eudicots
- Clade: Rosids
- Order: Myrtales
- Family: Myrtaceae
- Genus: Lamarchea
- Species: L. hakeifolia

Binomial name
- Lamarchea hakeifolia Gaudich.

Species of shrub

Lamarchea hakeifolia is a member of the family Myrtaceae endemic to Western Australia.

The shrub typically grows to a height of 1.5 to 5 metres (5 to 16 ft). It blooms between August and January producing orange-yellow or green-red flowers.

It is found on sand dunes and undulating plains along the west coast of the Mid West and Gascoyne regions of Western Australia in an area between Carnarvon and Northampton where it grows in sandy to loamy soils.

There are two known varieties of the species:

- Lamarchea hakeifolia var. brevifolia
- Lamarchea hakeifolia var. hakeifolia
