= Marion Blackwell =

Australian landscape architect and ecologist (1928–2026)

Marion Blackwell AM
- Born: 3 April 1928; Manilla, New South Wales, Australia
- Died: 22 August 2026 (aged 98); Perth, Western Australia, Australia
- Education: University of Sydney; Hornsby Girls' High School
- Occupation: Landscape architect • ecologist

Marion Isabel Blackwell (3 April 1928 – 22 August 2026) was an Australian landscape architect and ecologist.

== Life and career ==
Born on 3 April 1928, Marion Blackwell grew up on a station eighteen miles from Manilla, New South Wales with her three siblings. She gained early education about the land and gardening from an Aboriginal stockman who worked at their station, and her grandfather. At seven, she developed a formula to stop milk from going sour which allowed her to foster orphaned baby marsupials. This was then published within Agricultural Gazette by an agriculturalist who visited the station.

Blackwell attended primary school through Blackfriars Correspondence School via radio, and secondary school at Sydney's Hornsby Girls High School.

She had hoped to study veterinary science at university, however enrolment was not open to women at the time. Instead, she enrolled in a Bachelor of Science at University of Sydney, majoring in plant physiology and ecology. Following her graduation, she took a role at the New South Wales University of Technology as lecturer in mycology. She remained in this role until 1958 when she and her husband moved to Western Australia, after he was offered a job forming a medical school in Perth. At the time, Blackwell was pregnant with their second child.

In Western Australia, Blackwell lectured part-time in the Department of Botany and School of Architecture at University of Western Australia. She later became Murdoch University’s Landscape Consultant in 1973 and they would rename a garden she designed as the Marion Blackwell Garden in her honour in 2024.

Blackwell founded a landscape architecture firm Blackwell and Associates in 1987 with her son Tony.

In 1991, Blackwell became chairperson of the advisory committee to the Australian National Botanic Gardens. Then in 1995, she was appointed to the board of Western Australia's Environmental Protection Authority.

The Western Australian flower Eremaea blackwelliana was named after her.

Blackwell died in Perth on 22 August 2026, at the age of 98. She was survived by her husband and three children.

== Awards ==
- 1987 – Western Australian Civic Design Award
- 2011 – Member of the Order of Australia
- 2018 – Honorary Doctorate from Murdoch University
