= Lamarchea sulcata =

Scientific classification
- Kingdom: Plantae
- Clade: Tracheophytes
- Clade: Angiosperms
- Clade: Eudicots
- Clade: Rosids
- Order: Myrtales
- Family: Myrtaceae
- Genus: Lamarchea
- Species: L. sulcata

Binomial name
- Lamarchea sulcata A.S.George

Species of shrub

Lamarchea sulcata is a member of the family Myrtaceae endemic to Western Australia and the Northern Territory.

The spreading shrub typically grows to a height of 0.6 to 2 metres (2 to 7 ft). Depending on rainfall it blooms between August and October producing green-red flowers.

It is found on sand dunes, rocky hills and flats in the Pilbara and Goldfields-Esperance regions of Western Australia where it grows in gravelly sandy to loamy soils.

The species was first described in 1972 by the botanist Alex George in the article A revision of the genus Lamarchea Gaudichaud (Myrtaceae: Leptospermoideae) published in the journal Nuytsia.
