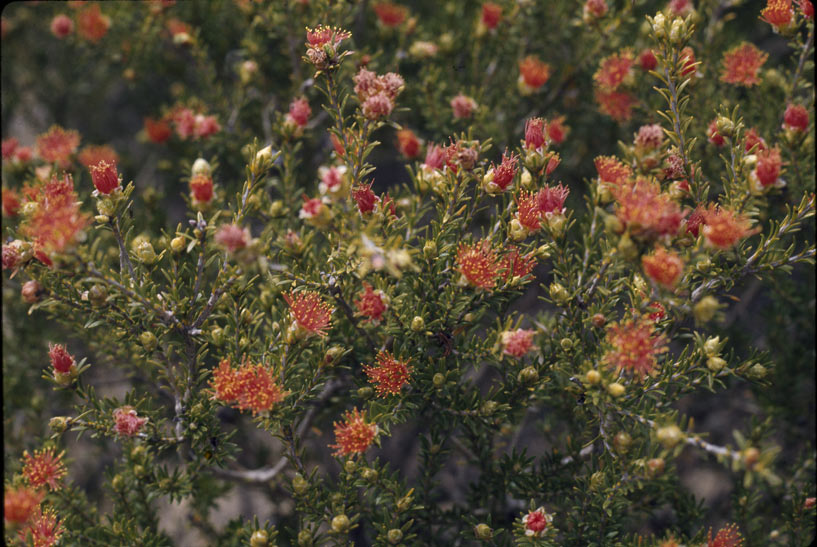

Conservation status
- Priority Three — Poorly Known Taxa (DEC)

Scientific classification
- Kingdom: Plantae
- Clade: Tracheophytes
- Clade: Angiosperms
- Clade: Eudicots
- Clade: Rosids
- Order: Myrtales
- Family: Myrtaceae
- Genus: Eremaea
- Species: E. acutifolia

Binomial name
- Eremaea acutifolia F.Muell.

Synonyms
- Melaleuca acrifolia Craven & R.D.Edwards

= Eremaea acutifolia =

Rusty eremaea

Species of flowering plant

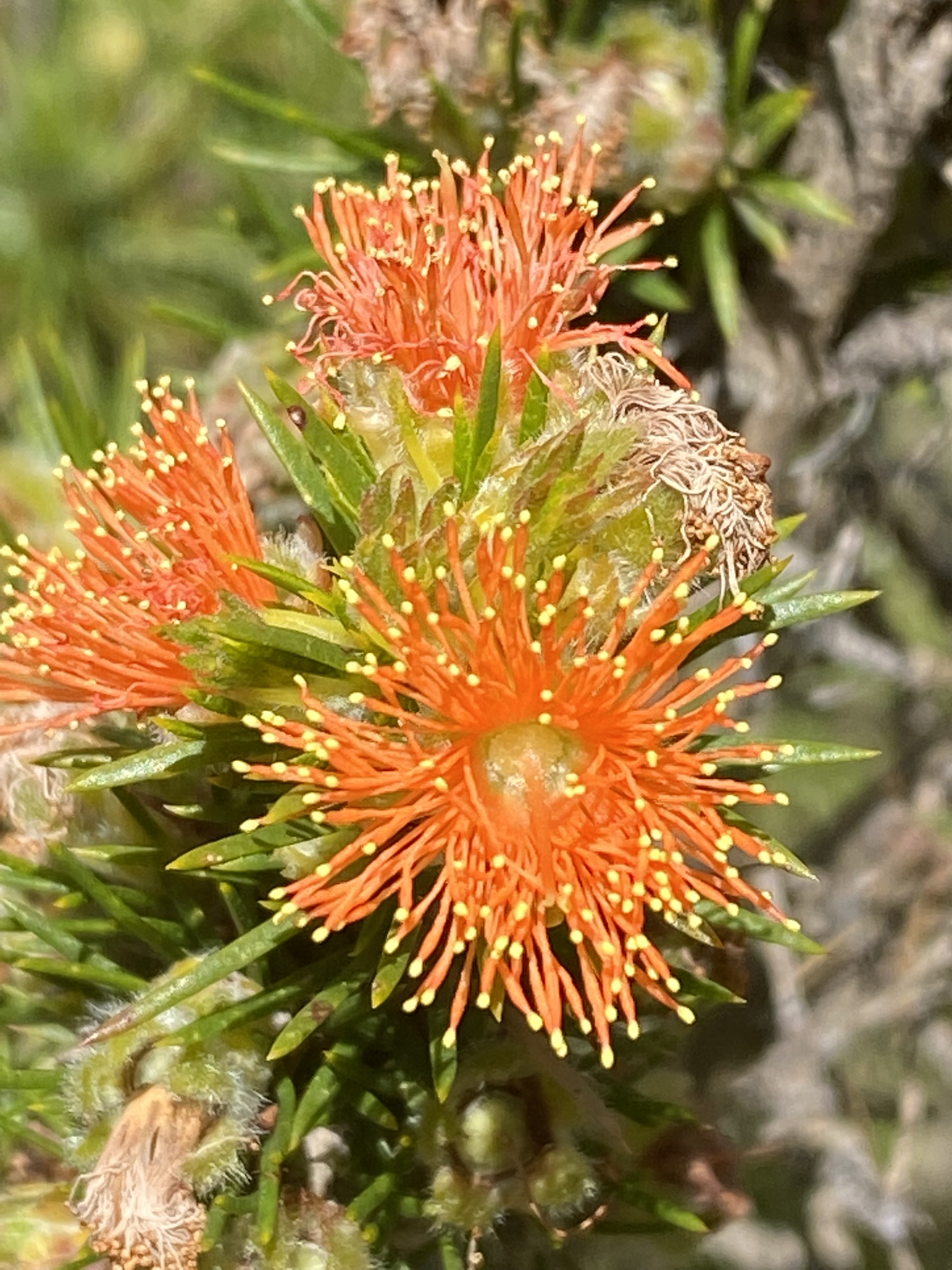
Flowers

Eremaea acutifolia, commonly known as rusty eremaea, is a plant in the myrtle family, Myrtaceae and is endemic to the south-west of Western Australia. It is a small shrub with needle-like leaves and which bears orange-coloured flowers on short side branches and fruits with a surface that is rough to the touch.

== Description ==
Eremaea acutifolia is an erect to spreading shrub which sometimes grows to a height of 0.7 metres (2 ft) and which, unlike some others in the genus, lacks a lignotuber. The leaves are linear to narrow elliptic in shape, 3.6–9.5 millimetres (0.1–0.4 in) long, 0.5–1.2 millimetres (0.02–0.05 in) wide and have a single prominent vein visible on the lower surface.

The flowers are usually orange, rarely dark pink and are on the ends of short side branches off the previous year's wood. The flowers occur singly, rarely two together. There are 5 sepals which are hairy on the outside surface and 5 petals 3–4 millimetres (0.1–0.2 in) long. The stamens are arranged in 5 bundles, each containing 28 to 34 stamens. Flowering occurs from August to November and is followed by fruits which are woody capsules. The capsules are 3.5–6 millimetres (0.1–0.2 in) long, shaped like an inverted cone and are rough or lumpy on the outer surface.

== Taxonomy and naming ==
Eremaea acutifolia was first formally described in 1860 by Ferdinand von Mueller in Fragmenta Phytographiae Australiae. The specific epithet (acutifolia) is from the Latin acutus meaning "sharp" or "pointed" and folium meaning "a leaf" referring to the pointed leaves of this species.

== Distribution and habitat ==
Eremaea acutifolia is only found in a small area east of Geraldton in the Avon Wheatbelt and Geraldton Sandplains biogeographic regions. It grows in sand on sandplains.

== Conservation ==
Eremaea acutifolia is classified as "Priority Three" by the Western Australian Government Department of Parks and Wildlife meaning that it is poorly known and known from only a few locations but is not under imminent threat.
