= School in the Mailbox =

1947 film

- Directed by: Stanley Hawes
- Written by: Catherine Duncan
- Production company: Australian National Film Board
- Release date: 1946
- Running time: 19 minutes
- Country: Australia
- Language: English

School in the Mailbox is a 1946 Australian short documentary film directed by Stanley Hawes.

== History ==
The film was made by the Australian National Film Board in 1946. It showed how Australian students received their education over long distances through correspondence. Lessons are shown being sent to students by different means, including plane, train, car, horse, camel, and radio.

The primary subject was Blackfriars Correspondence School, with teachers and students from the school appearing in the film.

It was directed by Stanley Hawes, photographed by William Trerise, with music composed by John Antill.

The film was sent to Paris as Australia's contribution to the 1946 UNESCO conference. This was the organisation's first general conference, held between November and December of that year.

It was nominated for Best Documentary Short at the 20th Academy Awards in 1947.
