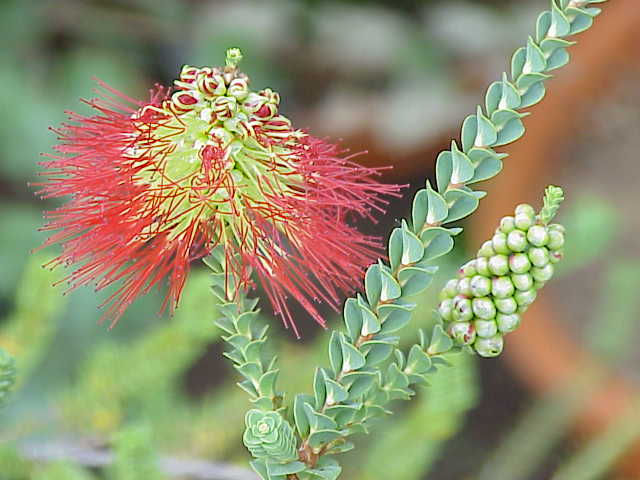
- Beaufortia orbifolia

Scientific classification
- Kingdom: Plantae
- Clade: Tracheophytes
- Clade: Angiosperms
- Clade: Eudicots
- Clade: Rosids
- Order: Myrtales
- Family: Myrtaceae
- Subfamily: Myrtoideae
- Tribe: Melaleuceae

= Melaleuceae =

Tribe of plants in the myrtle family

Melaleuceae is a tribe in the plant family Myrtaceae from south-east Asia and Oceania, with a main center of diversity in Australia.

== Genera ==
- Melaleuca (including Callistemon)
- Calothamnus
- Lamarchea
- Conothamnus
- Beaufortia
- Regelia
- Phymatocarpus
- Eremaea
