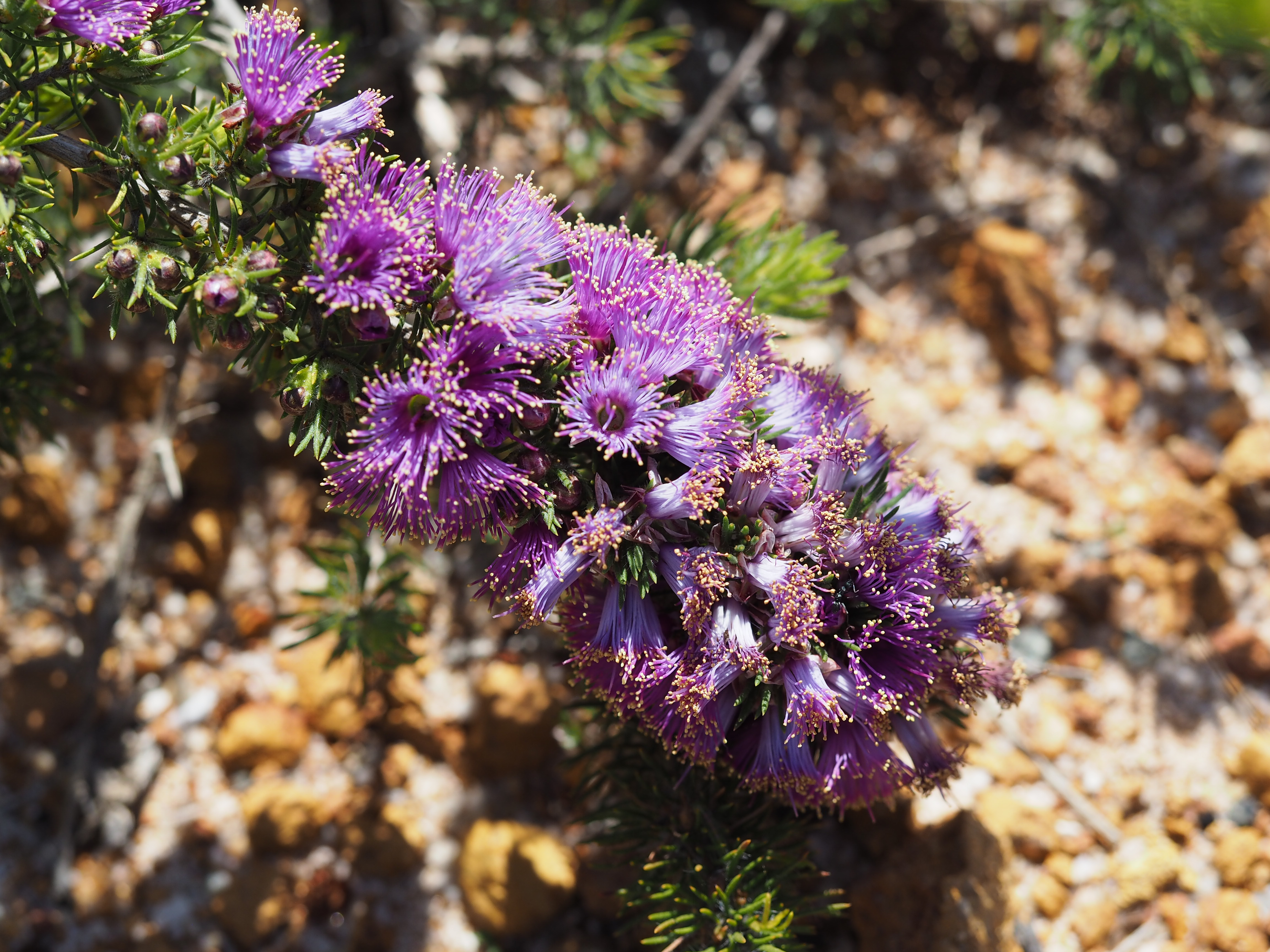
- Eremaea violacea growing in Lesueur National Park

Scientific classification
- Kingdom: Plantae
- Clade: Tracheophytes
- Clade: Angiosperms
- Clade: Eudicots
- Clade: Rosids
- Order: Myrtales
- Family: Myrtaceae
- Genus: Eremaea
- Species: E. violacea

Binomial name
- Eremaea violacea F.Muell.

Synonyms
- Melaleuca kybeliona Craven & R.D.Edwards

= Eremaea violacea =

Species of flowering plant

Eremaea violacea is a plant in the myrtle family, Myrtaceae and is endemic to the south-west of Western Australia. It is low, spreading shrub with narrow, prickly leaves and which bears violet-coloured flowers on short side branches.

== Description ==
Eremaea violacea is a spreading to prostrate shrub which grows to a height of about 1.0 metre (3 ft) and which has its younger branches densely covered with fine hairs. The leaves are linear to narrow egg-shaped, 7–12 millimetres (0.3–0.5 in) long, 0.4–1.2 millimetres (0.02–0.05 in) wide, flat or circular in cross section, depending on subspecies. (The two subspecies can be distinguished from each other by their cross section.)

As suggested by its name, the flowers are violet coloured and are on the ends of short side branches off longer ones which grew earlier in the previous year. The flowers occur in groups of up to 7. There are 5 sepals which are usually hairy on the outside surface and 5 petals 2.3–4.5 millimetres (0.09–0.2 in) long. The stamens are arranged in 5 bundles, each containing 24 to 32 stamens. Flowering occurs from September to October and is followed by fruits which are woody capsules. The capsules are 5–8 millimetres (0.2–0.3 in) long, 6–7.5 millimetres (0.2–0.3 in) wide, cup shaped to almost spherical and are smooth on the outer surface.

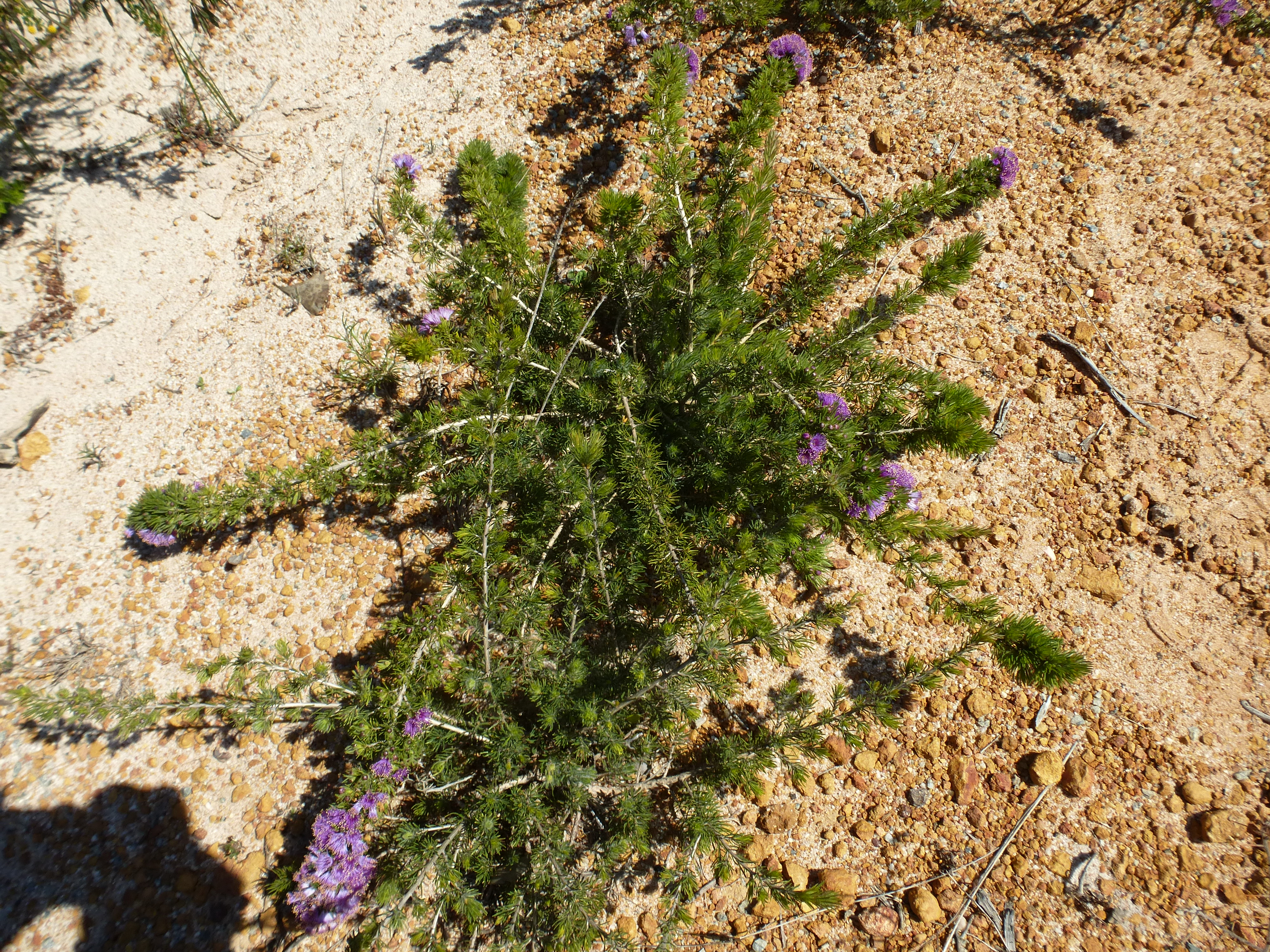
Eremaea violacea habit

== Taxonomy and naming ==
Eremaea violacea was first formally described in 1878 by Ferdinand von Mueller in Fragmenta Phytographiae Australiae. The specific epithet (violacea) is from the Latin violaceus meaning "having a purple colour".

There are two subspecies:

- Eremaea violacea F.Muell. var. violacea has flat leaves and is restricted to areas between the Irwin and Greenough rivers;
- Eremaea violacea subsp. raphiophylla Hnatiuk has long, thin cylindrical leaves and occurs between the Arrowsmith and Hill rivers.

== Distribution and habitat ==
Eremaea violacea is found in the Irwin district in the Geraldton Sandplains and Swan Coastal Plain biogeographic regions. It grows in sand, sandy clay or soils derived from laterite on sandplains, ridges and roadsides.

== Conservation ==
Both subspecies of Eremaea violacea are classified as "not threatened" by the Western Australian Government Department of Parks and Wildlife.
