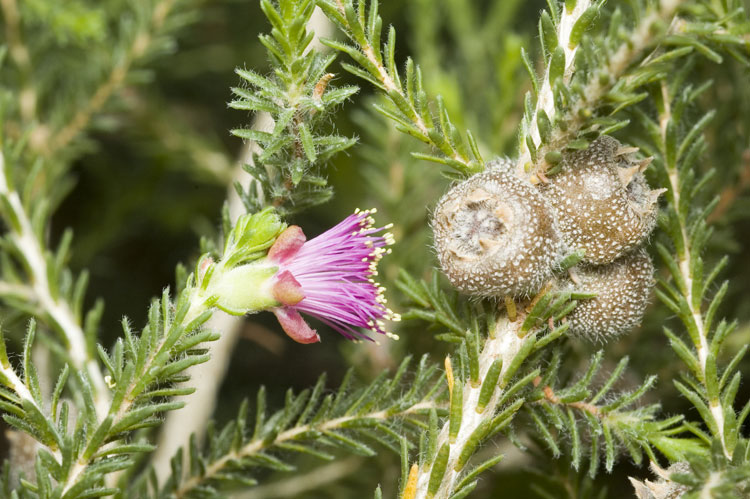

Scientific classification
- Kingdom: Plantae
- Clade: Tracheophytes
- Clade: Angiosperms
- Clade: Eudicots
- Clade: Rosids
- Order: Myrtales
- Family: Myrtaceae
- Genus: Eremaea
- Species: E. purpurea

Binomial name
- Eremaea purpurea C.A.Gardner

Synonyms
- Melaleuca ostrina Craven & R.D.Edwards

= Eremaea purpurea =

Species of flowering plant

Eremaea purpurea is a plant in the myrtle family, Myrtaceae and is endemic to the south-west of Western Australia. It is a shrub with erect branches, small leaves and purple flowers in pairs on the ends of the branches. The fruits are woody, cup-shaped capsules which release their seeds when dry.

== Description ==
Eremaea purpurea is a shrub growing to a height of about 1.0 metre (3 ft). The branches point upwards and the young stems are densely covered with hair. The leaves are narrow egg-shaped, tapering to a point and are 2–4.5 millimetres (0.08–0.2 in) long, 2–2.5 millimetres (0.08–0.1 in) wide and sometimes have a single vein visible on the lower surface. There are a few long, soft hairs on the upper surface and edges of the leaves.

The flowers are pink to deep pink and are borne usually in pairs on the ends of the branches. They have 5 sepals which are often hairy on the outside surface and 5 petals, 4.2–4.5 millimetres (0.17–0.18 in) long. The stamens, which give the flower its colour are arranged in 5 bundles, each containing 14 to 33 stamens. Flowering occurs from December to January and is followed by fruits which are woody capsules which are 5.4–6.5 millimetres (0.2–0.3 in) long.

== Taxonomy and naming ==
Eremaea purpurea was first formally described in 1964 by Charles Gardner in Journal of the Royal Society of Western Australia. The specific epithet (purpurea) is from the Latin purpureus meaning "purple".

== Distribution and habitat ==
Eremaea purpurea occurs in the Darling district in the Geraldton Sandplains, Jarrah Forest and Swan Coastal Plain biogeographic regions. It grows in sandy soils, often on roadsides and in damp depressions.

== Conservation ==
Eremaea purpurea is classified as "not threatened" by the Western Australian Government Department of Parks and Wildlife.
