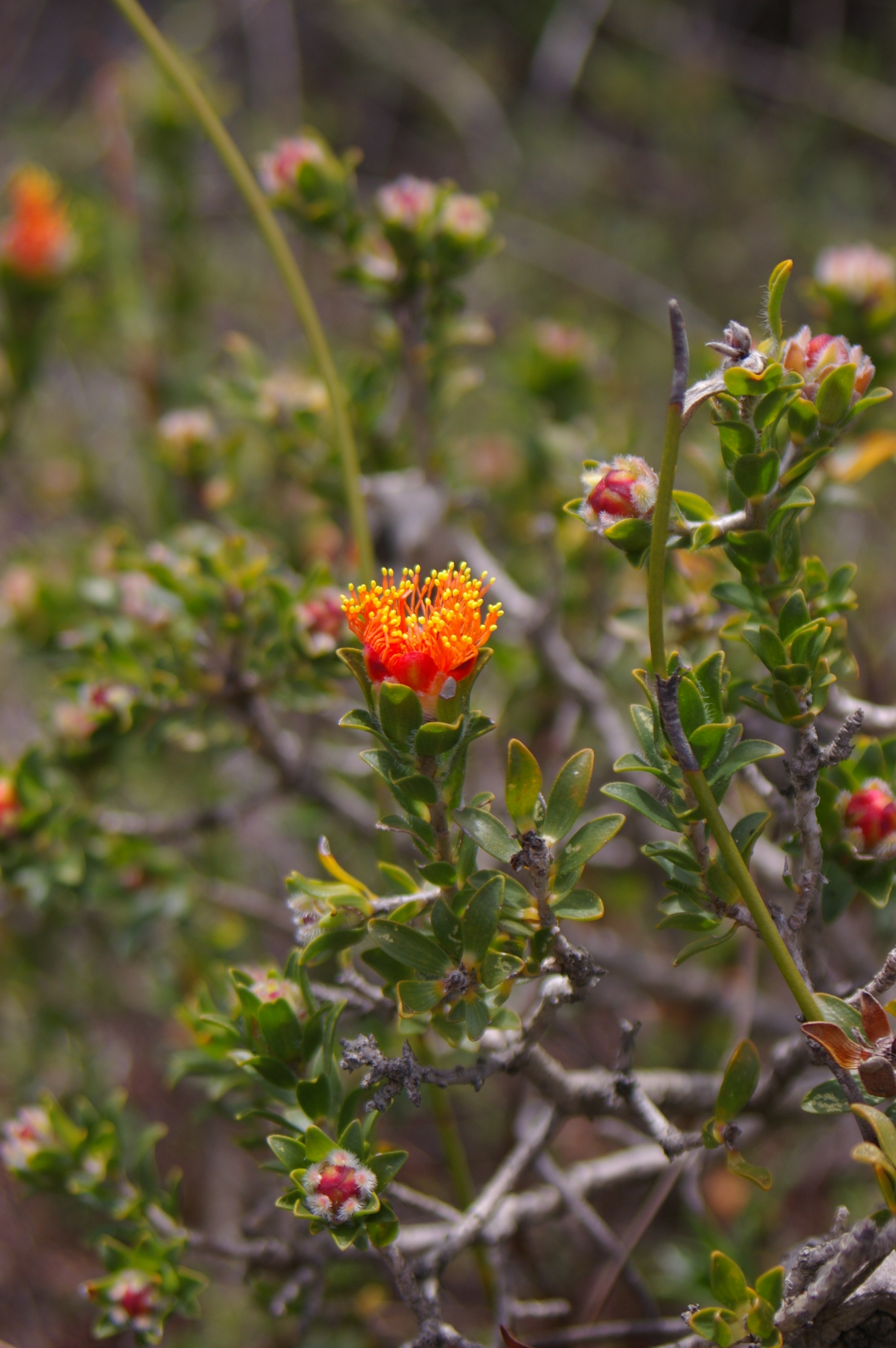
- In the Perth suburb of Southern River

Scientific classification
- Kingdom: Plantae
- Clade: Tracheophytes
- Clade: Angiosperms
- Clade: Eudicots
- Clade: Rosids
- Order: Myrtales
- Family: Myrtaceae
- Genus: Eremaea
- Species: E. asterocarpa

Binomial name
- Eremaea asterocarpa Hnatiuk

Synonyms
- Melaleuca asterocarpa (Hnatiuk) Craven & R.D.Edwards

= Eremaea asterocarpa =

Species of flowering plant

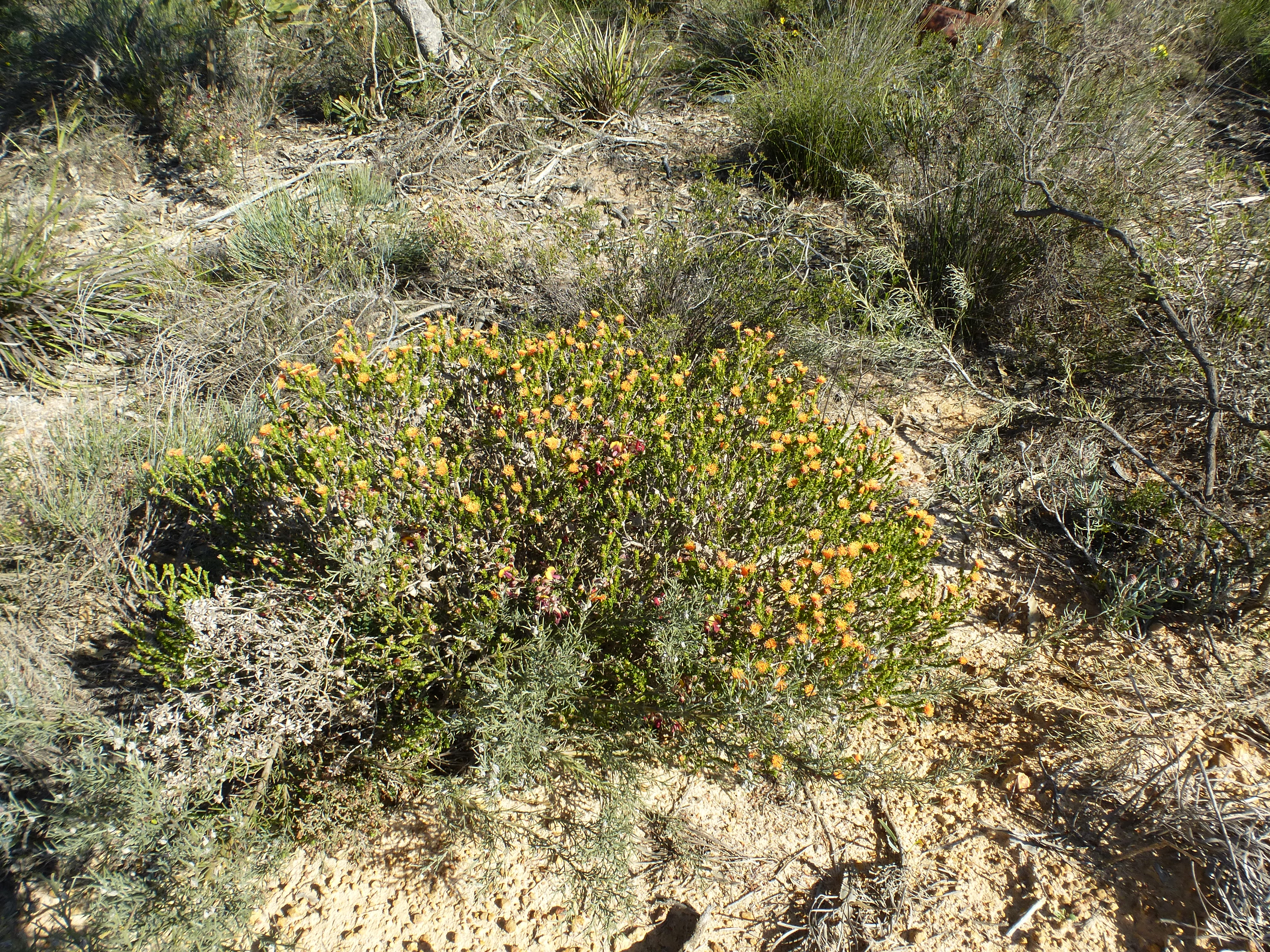
Habit near Badgingarra

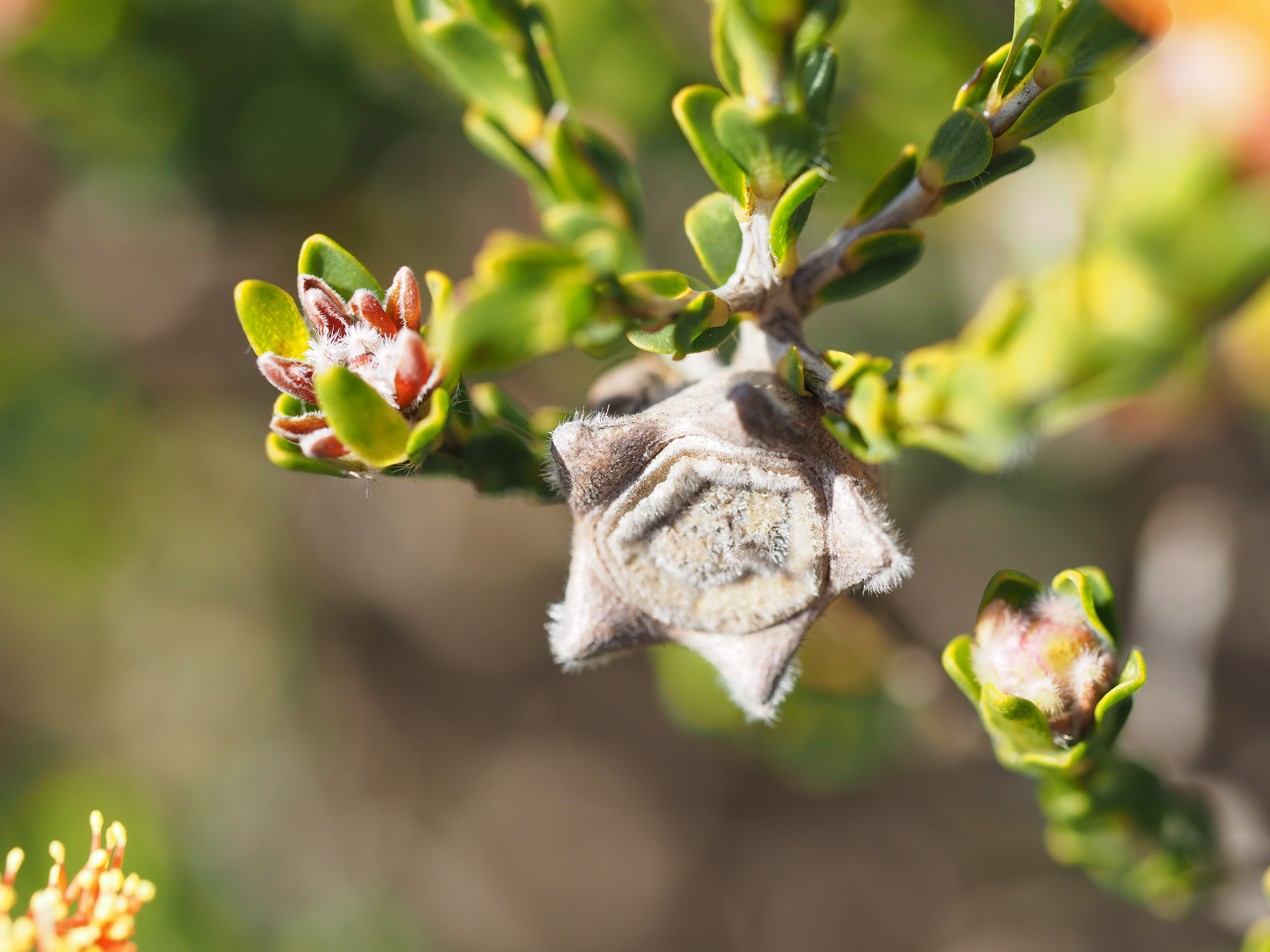
Fruit

Eremaea asterocarpa is a plant in the myrtle family, Myrtaceae and is endemic to the south-west of Western Australia. It is a shrub with broad, flat leaves, and orange-coloured flowers in late winter or spring. Single flowers appear on the ends of branches formed the previous year.

== Description ==
Eremaea asterocarpa is a shrub, growing to a height of 1.3 metres (4 ft). It has a variable form, sometimes low and spreading, others erect or short and twisted. The leaves are 3.4–8.3 millimetres (0.1–0.3 in) long, 1.0–4.5 millimetres (0.04–0.2 in) wide, elliptic or egg-shaped with the narrower end towards the base and have between 5 and 7 veins visible on the lower surface.

The flowers are orange-coloured, on the ends of the previous year's wood and occur singly or rarely, two together. There are 5 sepals which are densely hairy on the outside surface and 5 petals 4–6 millimetres (0.16–0.24 in) long. The stamens, which give the flower its colour, are arranged in 5 bundles, each containing 16 to 36 stamens. Flowering occurs from July to November and is followed by fruits which are woody capsules. The capsules are 6.9–8 millimetres (0.27–0.31 in) long, more or less cup-shaped, rough and lumpy with the remains of the sepals giving a star-like appearance to the end. It can be distinguished from other eremaeas by the rough fruits and the presence of 5 or more veins on the leaves.

== Taxonomy and naming ==
Eremaea asterocarpa was first formally described in 1993 by Roger Hnatiuk in Nuytsia. The specific epithet (asterocarpa) is from the Ancient Greek ἀστήρ (astḗr) meaning "a star" and καρπός (karpós) meaning "fruit", referring to the star-like pattern on the end of the fruit.

The names of three subspecies of Eremaea asterocarpa are accepted by the Australian Plant Census:

- Eremaea asterocarpa Hnatiuk subsp. asterocarpa has leaves with 3 (rarely 5) veins;
- Eremaea asterocarpa subsp. brachyclada Hnatiuk is a small, low shrub with short, twisted branches and leaves with 5 to 7 or more veins;
- Eremaea asterocarpa subsp. histoclada Hnatiuk is an erect plant with straight or slightly arched branches and leaves with 5 to 7 or more veins.

== Distribution and habitat ==
Eremaea asterocarpa is found in near-coastal areas of the south-west in the Geraldton Sandplains, Jarrah Forest and Swan Coastal Plain biogeographic regions. It grows in sand over laterite.

== Conservation ==
Eremaea asterocarpa is classified as "not threatened" by the Western Australian Government Department of Parks and Wildlife.
