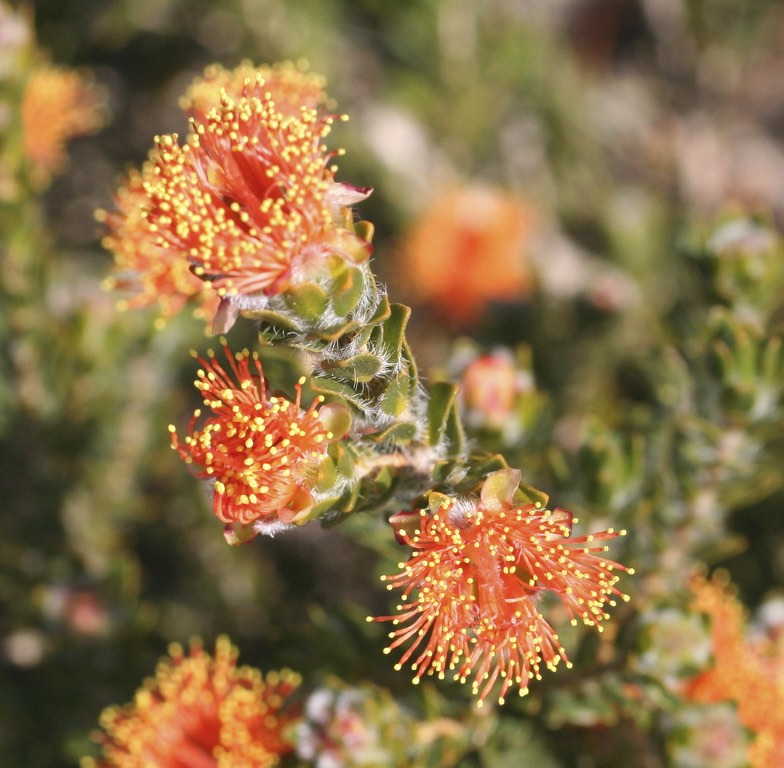

Scientific classification
- Kingdom: Plantae
- Clade: Tracheophytes
- Clade: Angiosperms
- Clade: Eudicots
- Clade: Rosids
- Order: Myrtales
- Family: Myrtaceae
- Genus: Eremaea
- Species: E. beaufortioides

Binomial name
- Eremaea beaufortioides Benth.

Synonyms
- Melaleuca beaufortioides (Benth.) Craven & R.D.Edwards

= Eremaea beaufortioides =

Species of flowering plant

Eremaea beaufortioides is a plant in the myrtle family, Myrtaceae and is endemic to the south-west of Western Australia. It is a spreading shrub with oval to egg-shaped leaves, and orange flowers in spring. Flowers appear in groups of one to six on the ends of long branches formed in the previous year.

== Description ==
Eremaea beaufortioides is a spreading shrub growing to a height of 2.2 metres (7 ft). Its leaves are 2.9–5.6 millimetres (0.1–0.2 in) long, 1.4–4.2 millimetres (0.06–0.2 in) wide, flat, linear to broad egg-shaped and with up to 7 veins sometimes visible on the lower surface. There is variation in leaf size and shape between the three varieties of the species.

The flowers are orange-coloured and arranged in groups of up to six on the ends of the branches of the previous year's growth. There are 5 sepals and 5 petals 3.5–5.7 millimetres (0.1–0.2 in) long. The stamens, which give the flower its colour, are arranged in 5 bundles, each containing 34 to 48 stamens. Flowering occurs from September to December and is followed by fruits which are woody capsules. The capsules are more or less barrel-shaped, smooth and 8–11 millimetres (0.3–0.4 in) long and 2.8–6.1 millimetres (0.1–0.2 in) wide.

== Taxonomy and naming ==
Eremaea beaufortioides was first formally described in 1867 by George Bentham in Flora Australiensis. The specific epithet (beaufortioides) is presumably a reference to the similarity of this species to a species of Beaufortia since εἶδος (eîdos) is an Ancient Greek word meaning “form" or "likeness”.

There are three varieties:

- Eremaea beaufortioides var. beaufortioides has thin leaves with 5 or more veins and flowers with a glabrous hypanthium;
- Eremaea beaufortioides var. lachnostanthe has thin leaves with 3 veins and flowers with a densely hairy hypanthium;
- Eremaea beaufortioides var. microphylla has small, thick leaves with fewer than 3 veins which may be hard to see.

== Distribution and habitat ==
Eremaea beaufortioides is found in the Irwin district in the Avon Wheatbelt, Geraldton Sandplains, Swan Coastal Plain and Yalgoo biogeographic regions. It grows in sand over laterite.

== Conservation ==
Eremaea beaufortioides is classified as "not threatened" by the Western Australian Government Department of Parks and Wildlife.

== Use in horticulture ==
Eremaea beaufortioides is an attractive species but although it is the hardiest of its genus, is difficult to grow in more humid areas unless grafted. It needs a sunny position and excellent drainage.
