= Eremaea hadra =

Scientific classification
- Kingdom: Plantae
- Clade: Tracheophytes
- Clade: Angiosperms
- Clade: Eudicots
- Clade: Rosids
- Order: Myrtales
- Family: Myrtaceae
- Genus: Eremaea
- Species: E. hadra

Binomial name
- Eremaea hadra Hnatiuk

Synonyms
- Melaleuca hadra (Hnatiuk) Craven & R.D.Edwards

Species of flowering plant

Eremaea hadra is a plant in the myrtle family, Myrtaceae and is endemic to the south-west of Western Australia. It is a shrub with thin, flat and very prickly leaves. It has violet-coloured flowers on the ends of its branches in late spring followed by smooth, cup-shaped fruits.

== Description ==
Eremaea hadra is a shrub growing to a height of 1.4 metres (5 ft) with erect branches and hairy younger branches. The leaves are thin, flat, 7.6–12.3 millimetres (0.3–0.5 in) long, 1.2–2.6 millimetres (0.05–0.1 in) wide, narrow elliptic in shape and taper to a sharp, prickly point. There is usually a single vein visible on the lower surface.

The flowers are deep violet and occur in groups of 2 to 9 on the ends of the longer branches which grew in the previous year or short ones of the latest growth. There are 5 sepals which are densely covered with hairs on the outside surface and 5 petals 4.4–5.2 millimetres (0.17–0.20 in) long. The stamens, which give the flower its colour, are arranged in 5 bundles, each containing 19 to 25 stamens. Flowering occurs from October to December and is followed by fruits which are woody capsules. The capsules are 5.6–6.5 millimetres (0.2–0.3 in) long, smooth on the outer surface and cup-shaped or roughly spherical.

== Taxonomy and naming ==
Eremaea hadra was first formally described in 1993 by Roger Hnatiuk in Nuytsia. The specific epithet (hadra) is from the Ancient Greek ἁδρός (hadrós) meaning "stout" or "strong".

== Distribution and habitat ==
Eremaea hadra is found on the edge of the escarpment between the Arrowsmith and Hill River districts in the Avon Wheatbelt, Geraldton Sandplains and Swan Coastal Plain biogeographic regions. It grows in gravelly over laterite.

== Conservation ==
Eremaea hadra is classified as "not threatened" by the Western Australian Government Department of Parks and Wildlife.
