= Lamarchea =

Scientific classification
- Kingdom: Plantae
- Clade: Tracheophytes
- Clade: Angiosperms
- Clade: Eudicots
- Clade: Rosids
- Order: Myrtales
- Family: Myrtaceae
- Subfamily: Myrtoideae
- Tribe: Melaleuceae
- Genus: Lamarchea; Gaudich.

Synonyms
- Lamarkea Rchb., spelling variant

Genus of shrubs

Lamarchea is a genus of shrub in the myrtle family Myrtaceae described as a genus in 1830. The entire genus is endemic to Australia.

Species

- Lamarchea hakeifolia Gaudich. - Shire of Irwin in Western Australia
- Lamarchea sulcata A.S.George - Western Australia, Northern Territory
