= Lesle Symes =

Australian librarian

Olga Lesle Symes MBE (22 August 1925 – 30 January 1982) was an Australian librarian who was a founder of the Library Automated Systems Information Exchange (LASIE).

Symes was born in Chatswood, New South Wales in 1925. The daughter of Olive Gertrude and Hessel Alexander Muldoon (a railway clerk), Symes graduated from Hornsby Girls' High School in 1942 and soon joined the Public Library of New South Wales as a junior library assistant.

She was an associate of the Australian Society of Accountants, and a fellow of the Library Association of Australia, and she was appointed MBE in 1970 for her contributions to Australian libraries. Symes died on the 30 January 1982 in Sydney.
