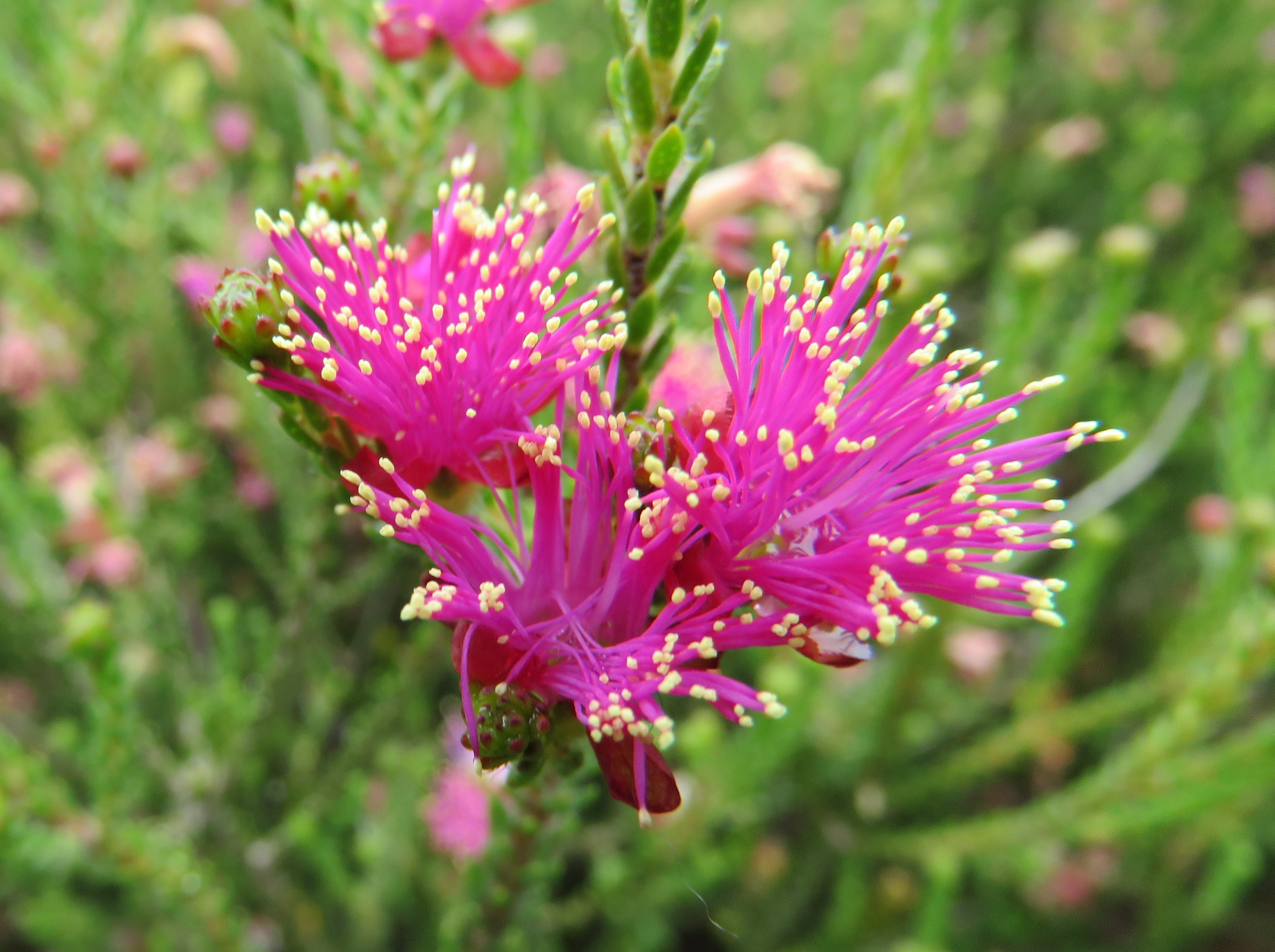
- Eremaea fimbriata in the Royal Botanic Gardens, Cranbourne

Scientific classification
- Kingdom: Plantae
- Clade: Tracheophytes
- Clade: Angiosperms
- Clade: Eudicots
- Clade: Rosids
- Order: Myrtales
- Family: Myrtaceae
- Genus: Eremaea
- Species: E. fimbriata

Binomial name
- Eremaea fimbriata Lindl.

Synonyms
- Eremaea fimbriata Lindl. var. fimbriata; Eremaea rosea C.A.Gardner & A.S.George; Melaleuca thysanota Craven & R.D.Edwards

= Eremaea fimbriata =

Species of flowering plant

Eremaea fimbriata is a plant in the myrtle family, Myrtaceae and is endemic to the south-west of Western Australia. It is a small shrub with small leaves and single purple flowers on the ends of the branches. The fruits are woody, urn-shaped with a small opening at the top. Unlike other eremaeas which remain dormant during winter, Eremaea fimbriata begins the new year's growth in July or August.

== Description ==
Eremaea fimbriata is a shrub growing to a height of about 1.0 metre (3 ft). The leaves are narrow egg-shaped, tapering to a point and are 4–8 millimetres (0.2–0.3 in) long, 0.5–4 millimetres (0.020–0.16 in) wide and have one or sometimes 3 veins visible on the lower surface. There are a few long, soft hairs on the upper surface and the lower surface is densely covered with short, fine hairs.

The flowers are pink to deep pink and are borne singly on the ends of long branches which grew in the previous year. The flowers are 10–20 millimetres (0.4–0.8 in) across and have are 5 sepals which are densely hairy on the outside surface and have a short tuft of hairs on the top. There 5 petals, 2.8–4.6 millimetres (0.1–0.2 in) long. The stamens are about 8 millimetres (0.3 in) long are arranged in 5 bundles, each containing 13 to 18 stamens. Flowering occurs from July to September and is followed by fruits which are woody capsules. The capsules are 8.6–11 millimetres (0.3–0.4 in) long, smooth and urn-shaped to almost spherical with a small opening.

== Taxonomy and naming ==
Eremaea fimbriata was first formally described in 1839 by John Lindley in A Sketch of the Vegetation of the Swan River Colony. The specific epithet (fimbriata) is from the Latin fimbriatus meaning "fringed".

== Distribution and habitat ==
Eremaea fimbriata occurs in near-coastal areas of the Irwin and Darling districts in the Geraldton Sandplains, Jarrah Forest and Swan Coastal Plain biogeographic regions. It grows in sandy soils, often with lateritic gravel.

== Conservation ==
Eremaea fimbriata is classified as "not threatened" by the Western Australian Government Department of Parks and Wildlife.
