= Roger Hnatiuk =

Roger James Hnatiuk (born 1946) is a Canadian-Australian botanist specialising in biogeography and plant ecology.

== Background ==
Hnatiuk was awarded 1st class honours in botany from the University of Alberta, and went on to graduate with an MSc in plant ecology from the same institution. He was awarded a PhD in biogeography from the Australian National University. Following his studies he worked on plant ecology in Western Australia. Hnatiuk was Assistant Director of the Australian Biological Resources Study, where he led the Flora of Australia Program and the Australian Biogeographic Information System Program. During this time he produced the Census of Australian Vascular Plants. From 1989 to 1992 he was Director of the Australian National Botanic Gardens. He went on to work as a research scientist at the Bureau of Rural Sciences, where his research was forestry and the sustainable use of natural resources.

He is a bonsai enthusiast; and he initiated the exhibition of Australian native plants as bonsai that are displayed at the Australian National Botanic Gardens annually. He was the inaugural chairman (2006 -) of the Bonsai Management Committee of the new National Bonsai and Penjing Collection of Australia, sponsored by the Government of the Australian Capital Territory, Canberra.

The lichen species Thelotrema hnatiukii was named in his honour in 2010.
