= Angove Lake =

Lake in Western Australia

- Location in Western Australia
- Interactive map of Angove Lake
- Location: Great Southern, Western Australia
- Coordinates: 34°56′32″S 118°09′54″E
- Type: Freshwater
- Primary inflows: Angove River
- Primary outflows: Gardner Creek
- Catchment area: 29 square kilometres (11 sq mi)
- Basin countries: Australia
- Designation: Two Peoples Bay Nature Reserve
- Max. length: 900 metres (2,953 ft)
- Max. width: 400 metres (1,312 ft)
- Surface area: 33 hectares (82 acres)

Angove Lake is a permanent fresh water lake in the Great Southern region of Western Australia, within the Two Peoples Bay Nature Reserve.

== Description ==
The lake is part of the Moates Lake System, along with Moates Lake and Lake Gardner. All of these lakes were linked to form a large estuarine system during the last interglacial period approximately 120,000 years ago.

The main waterbody covers a maximum area of 40 hectares (99 acres) but the associated wetlands cover an area closer to 100 hectares (247 acres). The area south of the lake was drained with a 3-kilometre (2 mi) channel being constructed to connect it with Gardner Creek. The water in the lake is fresh and low in tannin, water from the river system that supplies the lake is also used pumped to Albany as part of the town's water supply.

== Environment ==
The lake lies within the Two Peoples Bay Nature Reserve. Very little of the catchment is cleared so the stream system and the lake are in almost pristine condition. The lake itself is essentially a large sedge swamp with large stands of Baumea articulata with a fringing forest of paperbark and Agonis. The lake forms part of the Two Peoples Bay and Mount Manypeaks Important Bird Area, identified as such by BirdLife International because of its significance in the conservation of several rare and threatened bird species.

The critically endangered spotted galaxias (Galaxias truttaceus hesperius) is only found in the Angove River, the lake and the Goodga River.

== See also ==
- List of lakes of Australia § Western Australia
