= Leucopogon altissimus =

Conservation status
- Priority Three — Poorly Known Taxa (DEC)

Scientific classification
- Kingdom: Plantae
- Clade: Tracheophytes
- Clade: Angiosperms
- Clade: Eudicots
- Clade: Asterids
- Order: Ericales
- Family: Ericaceae
- Genus: Leucopogon
- Species: L. altissimus

Binomial name
- Leucopogon altissimus Hislop
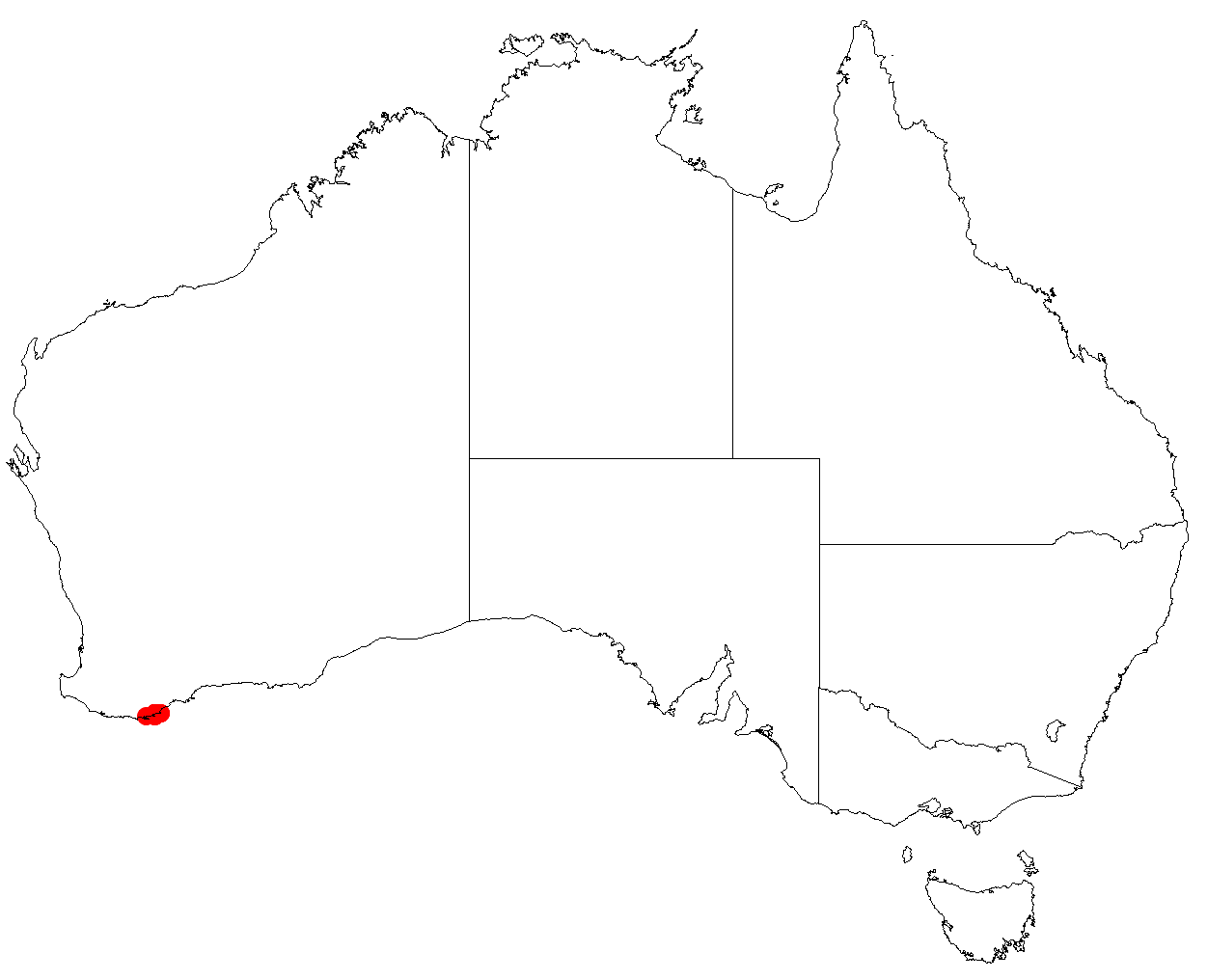
- Occurrence data from AVH

Species of plant

Leucopogon altissimus is a species of flowering plant in the heath family Ericaceae and is endemic to a restricted area in the south of Western Australia. It is a tall, erect shrub with glabrous branchlets, elliptic leaves and white or creamy-white flowers in groups in upper leaf axils or on the ends of branches.

== Description ==
Leucopogon altissimus is an erect shrub that typically grows up to about 3 m (9.8 ft) high and 2 m (6 ft 7 in) wide, with a single stem at the base, its young branchlets glabrous. The leaves are elliptic, sometimes narrowly so, 22–48 mm (0.87–1.89 in) long and 6–13 mm (0.24–0.51 in) wide on a petiole up to 2 mm (0.079 in) long. The leaves are more or less flat and glabrous, the upper surface shiny and the lower surface a paler shade of green. The flowers are arranged in groups of seven to seventeen at the ends of branchlets, or in upper leaf axils, with egg-shaped bracts 0.8–1.4 mm (0.031–0.055 in) long and similar bracteoles, the sepals egg-shaped, 1.6–2.4 mm (0.063–0.094 in) long and greenish. The petals are joined at the base to form a bell-shaped tube shorter than the sepals, the lobes creamy-white and 1.6–2.1 mm (0.063–0.083 in) long. Flowering mainly occurs from August to October and the fruit is a glabrous, elliptic drupe 2.9–3.5 mm (0.11–0.14 in) long.

== Taxonomy and naming ==
Leucopogon altissimus was first formally described in 2008 by Michael Clyde Hislop in the journal Nuytsia from specimens he collected east of Albany in 2006. The specific epithet (altissimus) means "highest".

== Distribution and habitat ==
This leucopogon mainly grows in a wide variety of habitats from sand dunes near the beach to dense heath on hilltops, but is only known from a small area between Two Peoples Bay, Cheyne Beach and Manypeaks in the Esperance Plains and Jarrah Forest biogeographic regions of southern Western Australia.

== Conservation status ==
Leucopogon altissimus is classified as "Priority Three" by the Government of Western Australia Department of Biodiversity, Conservation and Attractions, meaning that it is poorly known and known from only a few locations but is not under imminent threat.
