= Goodga River =

River in Western Australia

Coordinates: 34°56′55″S 118°4′48″E

Location
- Country: Australia

Physical characteristics
- Source
  - location: Reservoir Hill
- Mouth
  - location: Moates Lake
- Length: 9 km (5.6 mi)
- Discharge
  - average: 3,917 ML/a (0.1241 m^{3}/s; 4.383 cu ft/s)

The Goodga River is a river in the Great Southern region of Western Australia.

The river is located within the boundaries of Two Peoples Bay Nature Reserve about 15 kilometres (9 mi) east of Albany.

The river rises to the north of Reservoir Hill and flows in a southerly direction until it discharges into Moates Lake. This lake drains into Gardner Lake and eventually into Two Peoples Bay.

The average rainfall in the catchment area is 1,100 millimetres (43 in), with most falling in the winter months. The catchment mostly consists of Albany blackbutt (Eucalyptus staeri) and sheoak (Allocasuarina fraseriana) forest. Approximately one third of the catchment has been cleared for agriculture.

The name was first recorded in 1913 by a surveyor and is thought to be of Aboriginal origin.

A weir was built along the river in 1964 to measure stream flow; a fishway was built in 2000 to allow fish to migrate upstream of the weir.

The river is home to the endangered fish, the trout minnow (Galaxias truttaceus), which only occurs between the Goodga and the Angove River. In 2003, the first vertical slot fishway in Western Australia was installed in the river.
