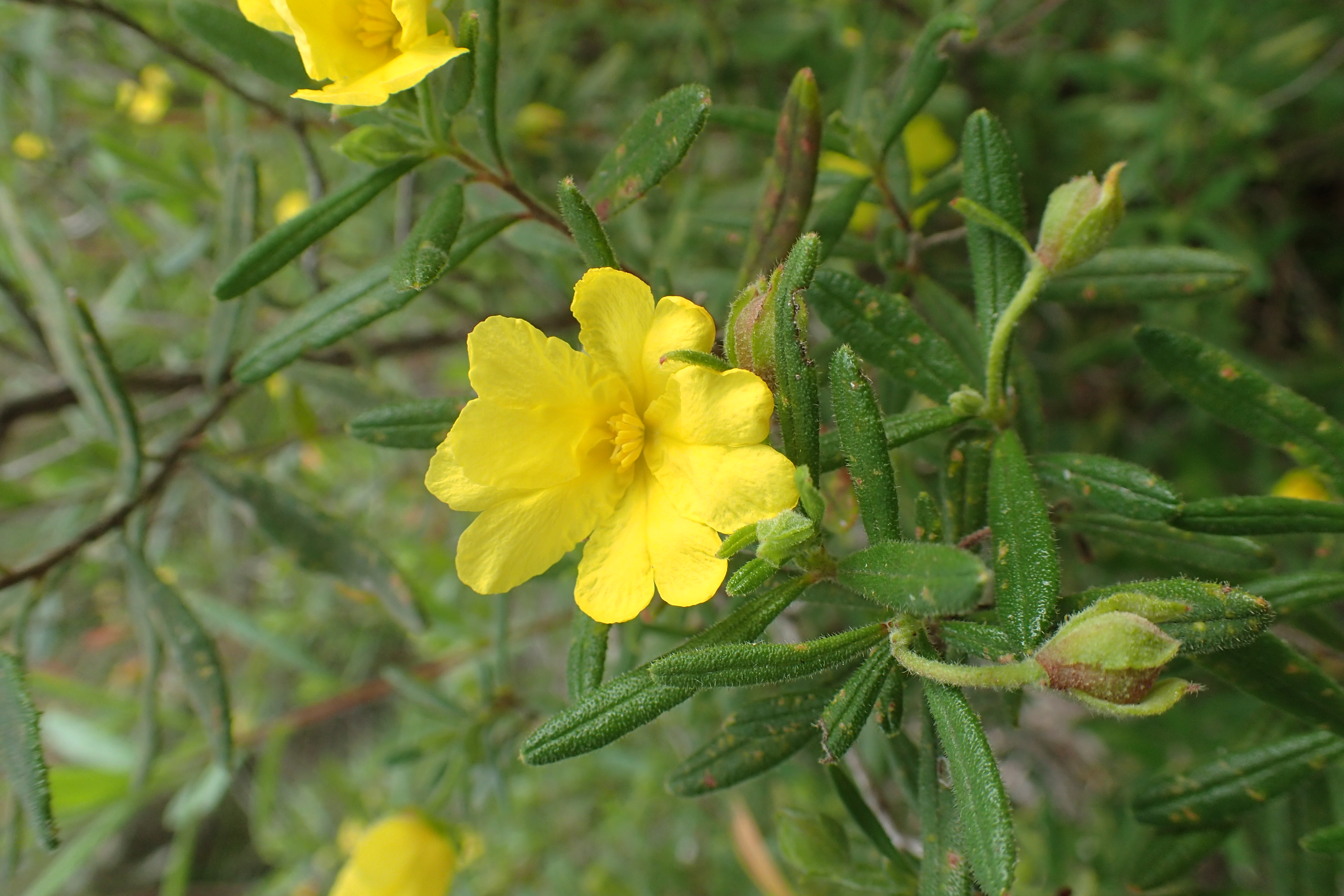

Scientific classification
- Kingdom: Plantae
- Clade: Tracheophytes
- Clade: Angiosperms
- Clade: Eudicots
- Order: Dilleniales
- Family: Dilleniaceae
- Genus: Hibbertia
- Species: H. furfuracea

Binomial name
- Hibbertia furfuracea (R.Br. ex DC.) Benth.

Synonyms
- Hemistemma asperifolium F.Muell.; Hibbertia astrophylla Steud.; Pleurandra furfuracea R.Br. ex DC.

= Hibbertia furfuracea =

Species of flowering plant

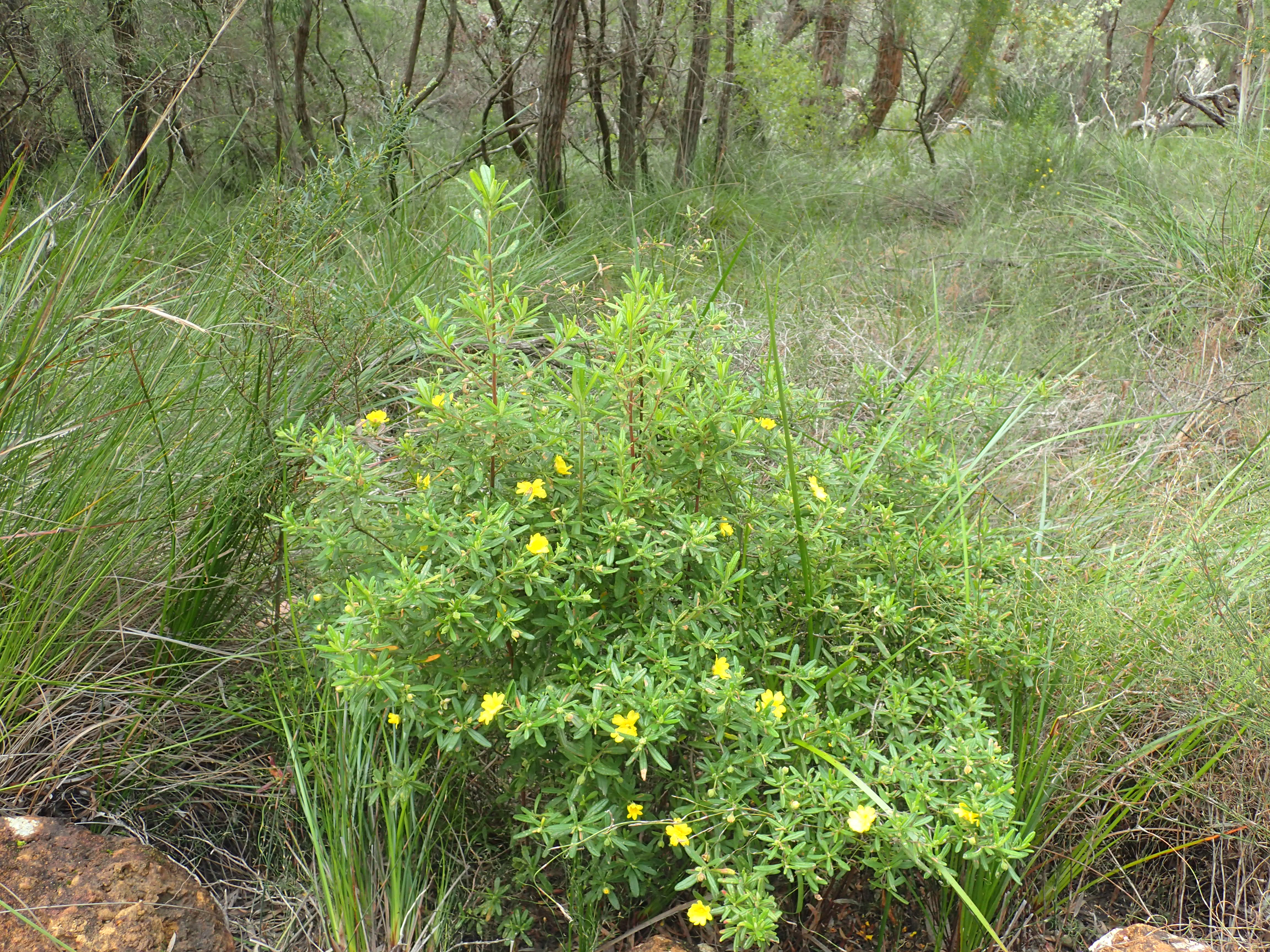
Habit near the Two Peoples Bay visitor centre

Hibbertia furfuracea is a species of flowering plant in the family Dilleniaceae and is endemic to near-coastal areas of south-western Western Australia. It is an erect shrub with narrow egg-shaped leaves with the narrower end towards the base, and yellow flowers borne in upper leaf axils, with ten to twelve stamens all on one side of two carpels.

== Description ==
Hibbertia furfuracea is an erect shrub that typically grows to a height of 1–2.5 m (3 ft 3 in – 8 ft 2 in) with hairy young branches. The leaves are narrow egg-shaped with the narrower end towards the base, 25–40 mm (0.98–1.57 in) long and up to 4–8 mm (0.16–0.31 in) wide with the edges turned downwards. The flowers are arranged singly in upper leaf axils on a pedicel 8–20 mm (0.31–0.79 in) long, with linear to narrow egg-shaped bracts 5–9 mm (0.20–0.35 in) long. The sepals are egg-shaped, 6.5–9 mm (0.26–0.35 in) long and the petals are yellow, 10–12 mm (0.39–0.47 in) long with a notch at the top. There are from ten to twelve stamens arranged on one side of the two hairy, spherical carpels, each carpel with four ovules. Flowering occurs from July to December.

== Taxonomy ==
This species was first formally described in 1817 by Augustin Pyramus de Candolle in his Regni Vegetabilis Systema Naturale and given the name Pleurandra furfuracea from an unpublished description by Robert Brown. In 1863, George Bentham changed the name to Hibbertia furfuracea in Flora Australiensis. The specific epithet (furfuracea) means "scurfy", referring to the branchlets and young leaves.

== Distribution and habitat ==
Hibbertia furfuracea is widespread and common in near-coastal areas between Cape Naturaliste and the Donnelly River and between Broke in the D'Entrecasteaux National Park and the Waychinicup River, in the Esperance Plains, Jarrah Forest and Warren biogeographic regions of south-western Western Australia.

== Conservation status ==
Hibbertia furfuracea is listed as "not threatened" by the Government of Western Australia Department of Parks and Wildlife,
