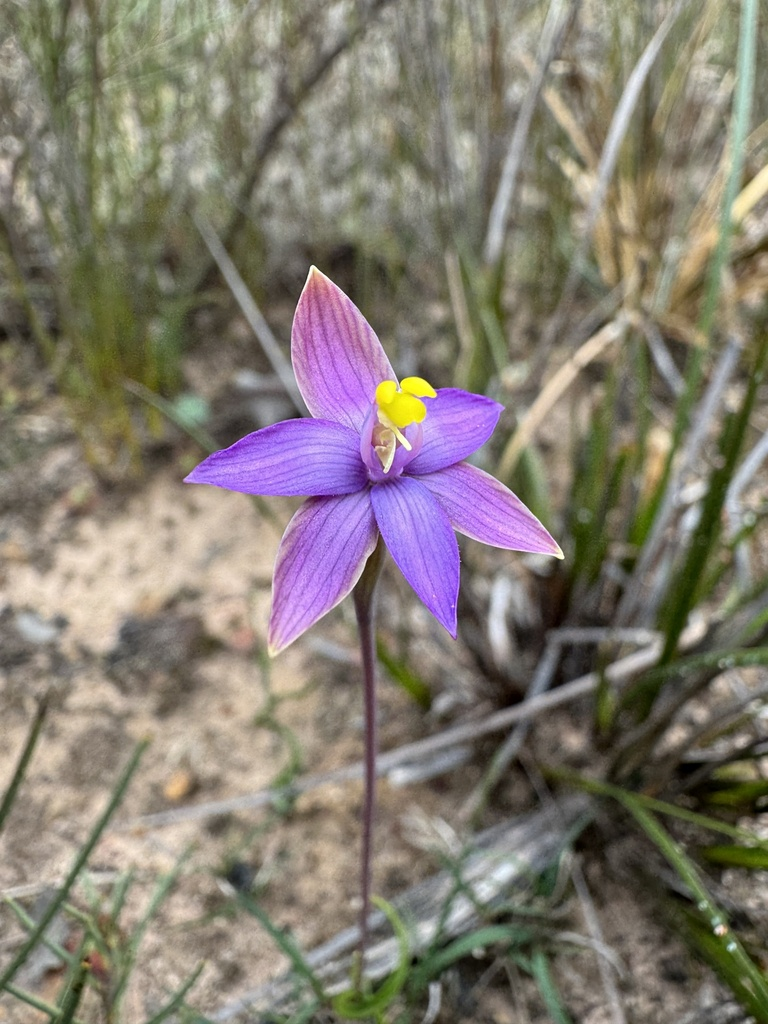

Scientific classification
- Kingdom: Plantae
- Clade: Embryophytes
- Clade: Tracheophytes
- Clade: Angiosperms
- Clade: Monocots
- Order: Asparagales
- Family: Orchidaceae
- Subfamily: Orchidoideae
- Tribe: Diurideae
- Genus: Thelymitra
- Species: T. uliginosa

Binomial name
- Thelymitra uliginosa Jeanes

= Thelymitra uliginosa =

Southern curly locks

Species of orchid

Thelymitra uliginosa, commonly called southern curly locks or swamp curly locks, is a species of orchid in the family Orchidaceae and endemic to the south-west of Western Australia. It has a single erect leaf, spiralling around the flowering stem and a single small pink, mauve, blue or purplish flower with darker veins and sometimes darker blotches. There are two narrow, yellow arms on the sides of the column.

== Description ==
Thelymitra uliginosa is a tuberous, perennial herb with a dark green leaf which is egg-shaped near the purplish base, then suddenly narrows to a linear, curved or spirally twisted upper part. The upper part is 30–80 mm (1–3 in) long and 2–3 mm (0.08–0.1 in) wide. There is usually only a single pink, mauve, blue or purplish flower with darker veins and sometimes darker blotches, 15–20 mm (0.6–0.8 in) wide borne on a flowering stem 100–200 mm (4–8 in) tall. The sepals and petals are 7–10 mm (0.3–0.4 in) long and 3–5 mm (0.1–0.2 in) wide. The column is a similar colour to the petals, about 3 mm (0.1 in) long and 2 mm (0.08 in) wide with a cluster of small glands on its back. There are two narrow yellow arms on the sides of the column. The flowers are self-pollinating, short-lived and only open on hot days. Flowering occurs in August and September and more prolifically after fire.

== Taxonomy and naming ==
Thelymitra uliginosa was first formally described in 2009 by Jeff Jeanes from a specimen collected in the Walpole-Nornalup National Park and the description was published in Muelleria. The specific epithet (uliginosa) is a Latin word meaning "full of moisture", "wet" or "marshy" referring to the habitat preference of this species.

== Distribution and habitat ==
Southern curly locks grows in shrubby vegetation in and around winter-wet areas and swamps. It is found mainly between Northcliffe and Mount Manypeaks but there are disjunct populations near Perth and Esperance, in the Esperance Plains, Jarrah Forest and Warren biogeographic regions.

== Conservation ==
Thelymitra uliginosa is classified as "not threatened" by the Western Australian Government Department of Parks and Wildlife.
