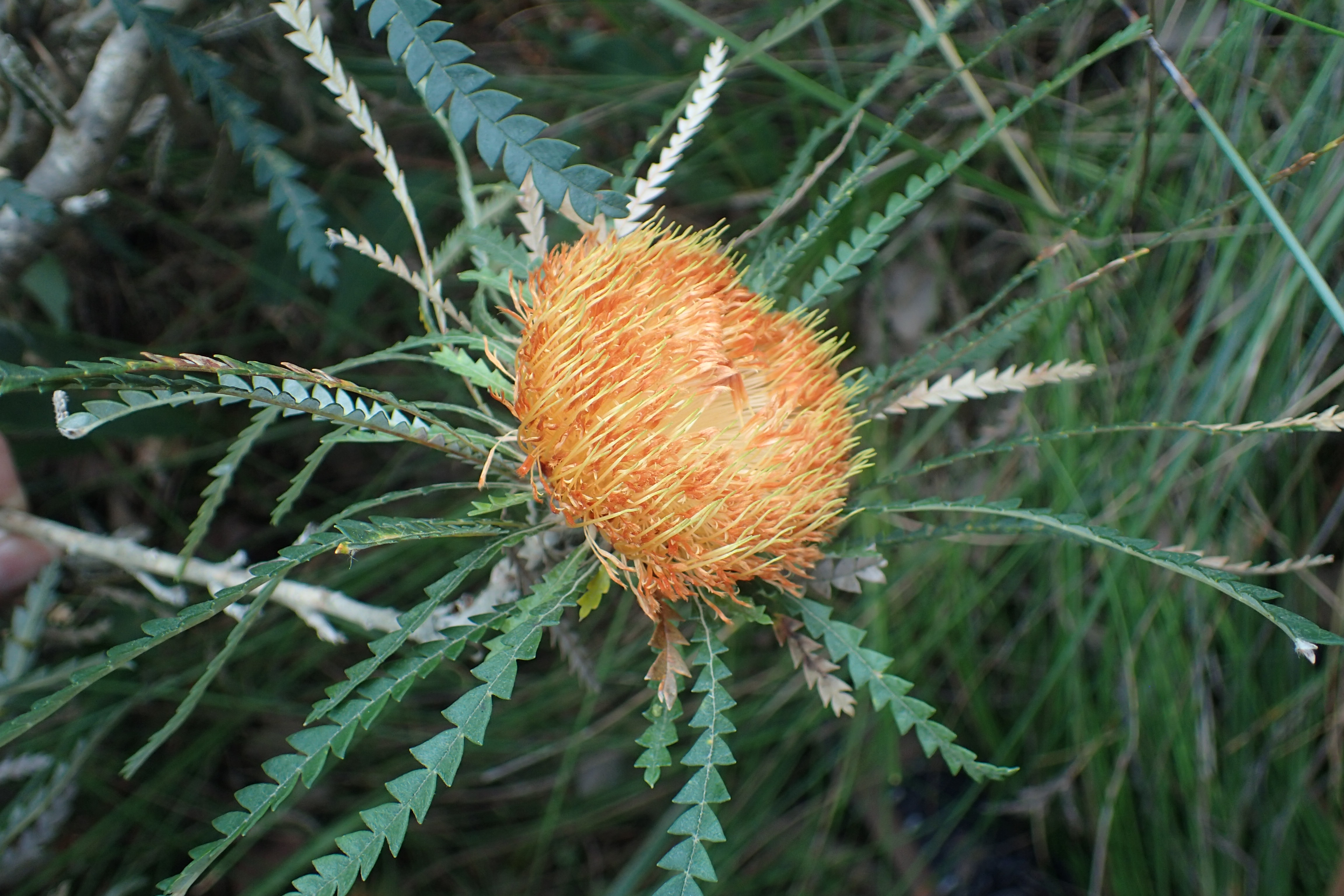
- On Mount Clarence, in Albany

Scientific classification
- Kingdom: Plantae
- Clade: Tracheophytes
- Clade: Angiosperms
- Clade: Eudicots
- Order: Proteales
- Family: Proteaceae
- Genus: Banksia
- Subgenus: Banksia subg. Banksia
- Series: Banksia ser. Dryandra
- Species: B. biterax

Binomial name
- Banksia biterax A.R.Mast & K.R.Thiele

Synonyms
- Dryandra baxteri R.Br.; Josephia baxteri (R.Br.) Kentze

= Banksia biterax =

Species of shrub endemic to Western Australia

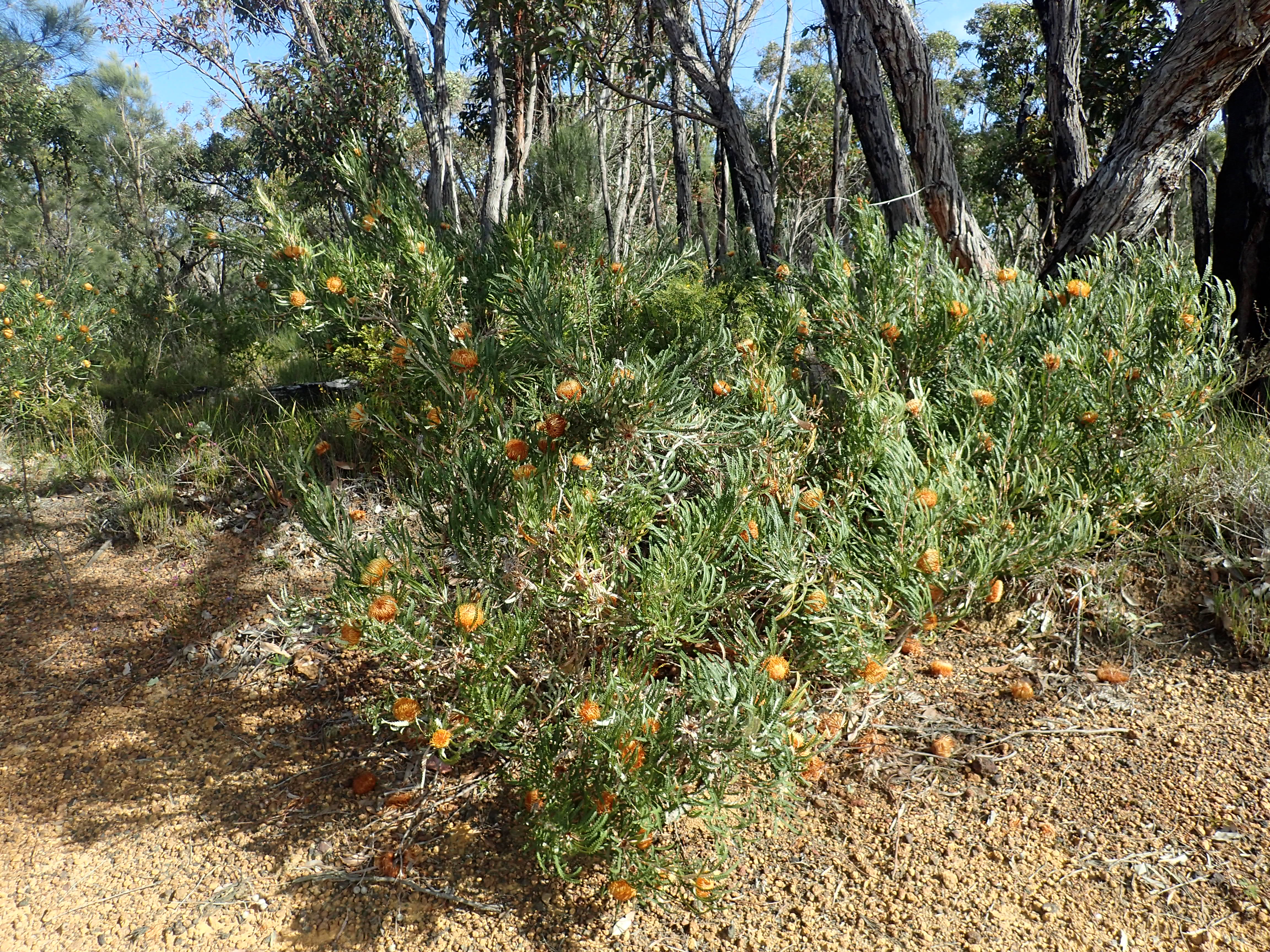
Habit in Two Peoples Bay Nature Reserve

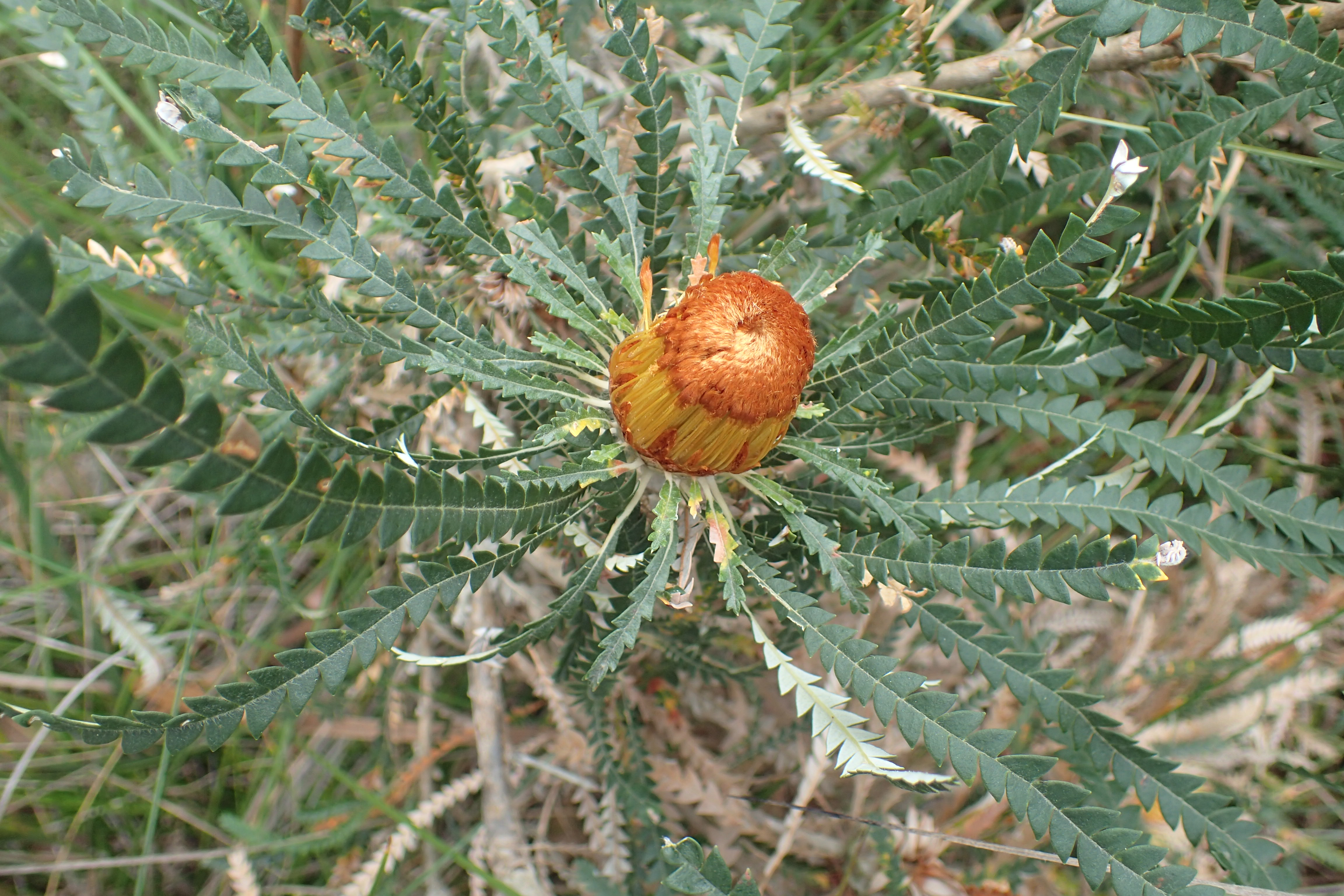
Flower buds

Banksia biterax is a species of dense shrub that is endemic to Western Australia. It has hairy stems, deeply serrated leaves and spikes of up to 200 pale to dark brown flowers.

== Description ==
Banksia biterax is a dense, rounded, bushy shrub that typically grows to a height of 1–2.5 m (3 ft 3 in – 8 ft 2 in) and has hairy stems but does not form a lignotuber. Its leaves are linear in outline, 150–350 mm (5.9–13.8 in) long and 4–6 mm (0.16–0.24 in) on a petiole up to 1.5 mm (0.059 in) long. The leaves are serrated to the midvein, with 60 to 110 triangular lobes and are woolly-hairy on the lower surface. The flower spikes are borne on short side branches and have between 150 and 200 pale to dark brown flowers each with a perianth 25–27 mm (0.98–1.06 in) long and a cream-coloured pistil 28–30 mm (1.1–1.2 in) long. Flowering occurs from May or July to October and the fruit is an egg-shaped follicle about 15 mm (0.59 in) long.

== Taxonomy and naming ==
This species was first described in 1830 by Robert Brown in the supplement to his Prodromus Florae Novae Hollandiae et Insulae Van Diemen and was given the name Dryandra baxteri. In 2007 Austin Mast and Kevin Thiele transferred all the dryandras to the genus Banksia but as there was already a plant named Banksia baxteri, Mast and Thiele chose the specific epithet "biterax", an anagram of baxteri.

== Distribution and habitat ==
Banksia biterax grows in kwongan and eucalyptus woodland near Busselton and between the Stirling Range and Albany.
