= Waychinicup National Park =

National park in Western Australia

- IUCN category II (national park)
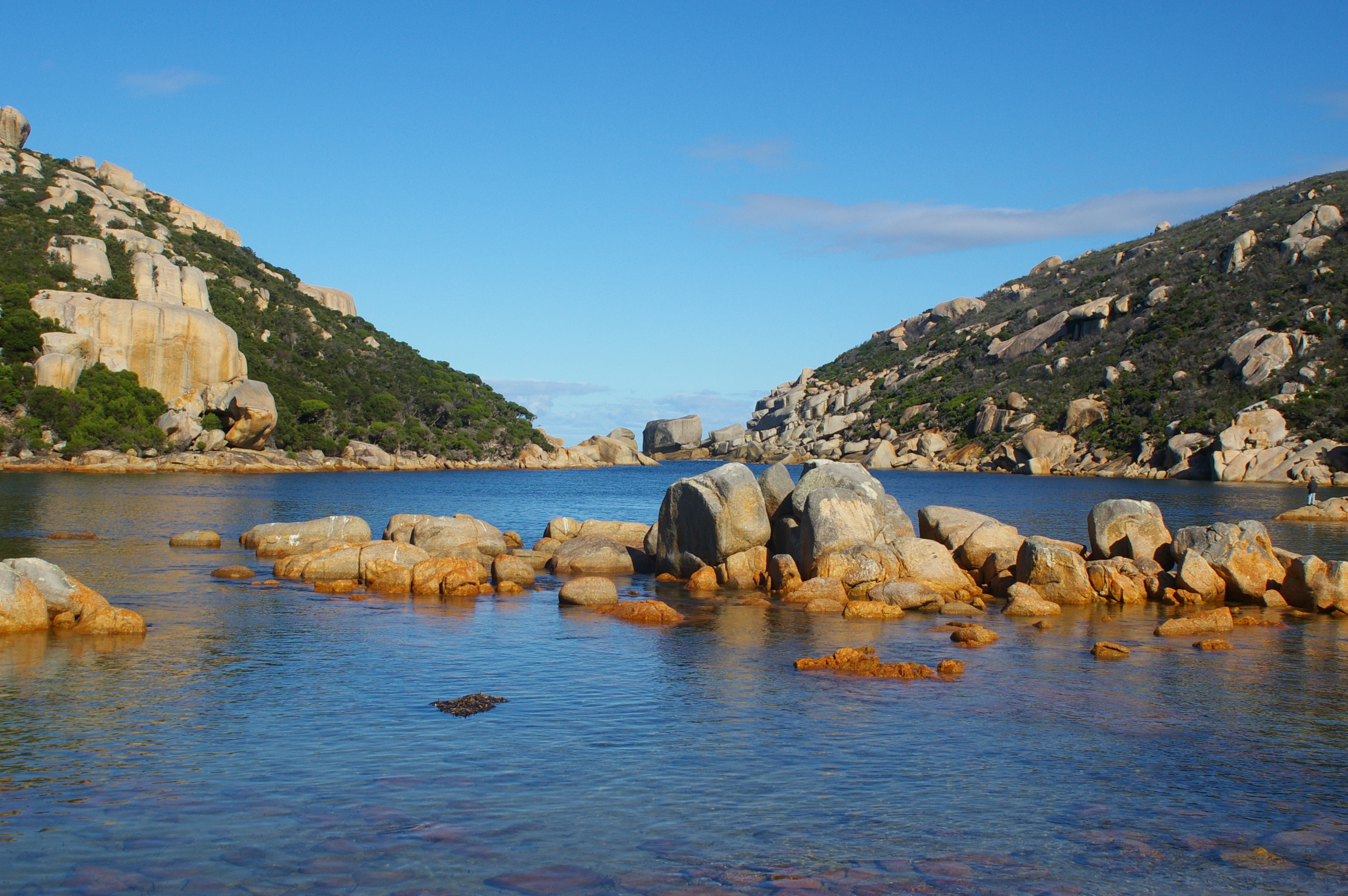
- Waychinicup Inlet

- Location within Western Australia
- Location: Western Australia
- Nearest city: Albany
- Coordinates: 34°52′38″S 118°22′20″E
- Area: 39.82 km^{2} (15.37 sq mi)
- Established: 1990
- Governing body: Department of Environment and Conservation
- Website: Official website

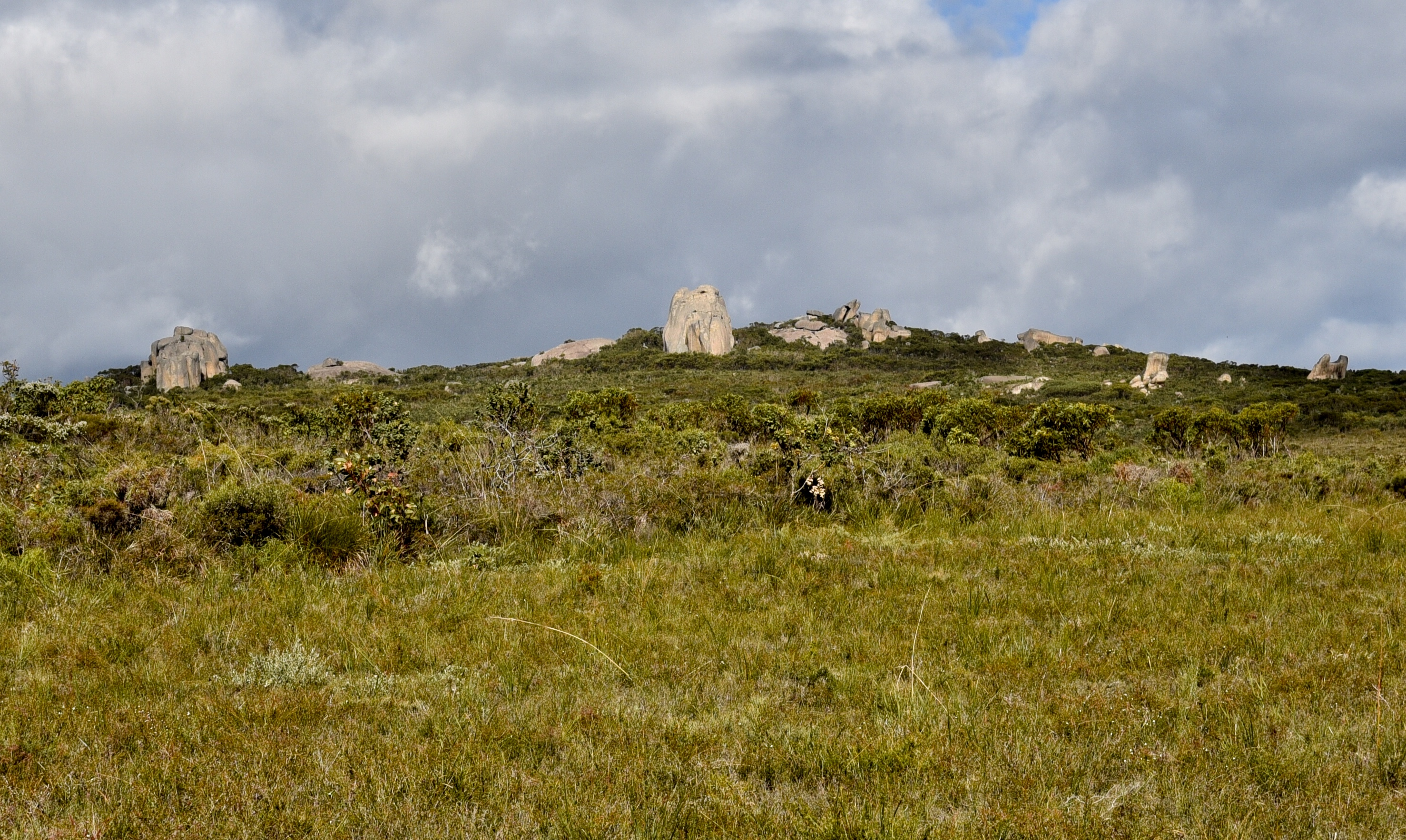
Waychinicup NP

Waychinicup National Park is in Western Australia, 404 kilometres (251 mi) southeast of Perth and 65 kilometres (40 mi) east of Albany, along the coast of the Southern Ocean.

== Location and description ==
The park is bordered by the Southern Ocean to the south, Mount Manypeaks Nature Reserve to the east, and agricultural land to the north. Its coastline runs between Normans Beach and Cheynes Beach, near Bremer Bay.

The park offers and array of landscapes, from the rugged coast to boulder-strewn hilltops. Tree-filled, deeply-incised valleys have freshwater streams flowing through them, with moss-covered boulders. Facilities provided include a camping area and bush toilet near the inlet of the Waychinicup River.

Bald Island Nature Reserve is located offshore nearby.

== Fauna ==
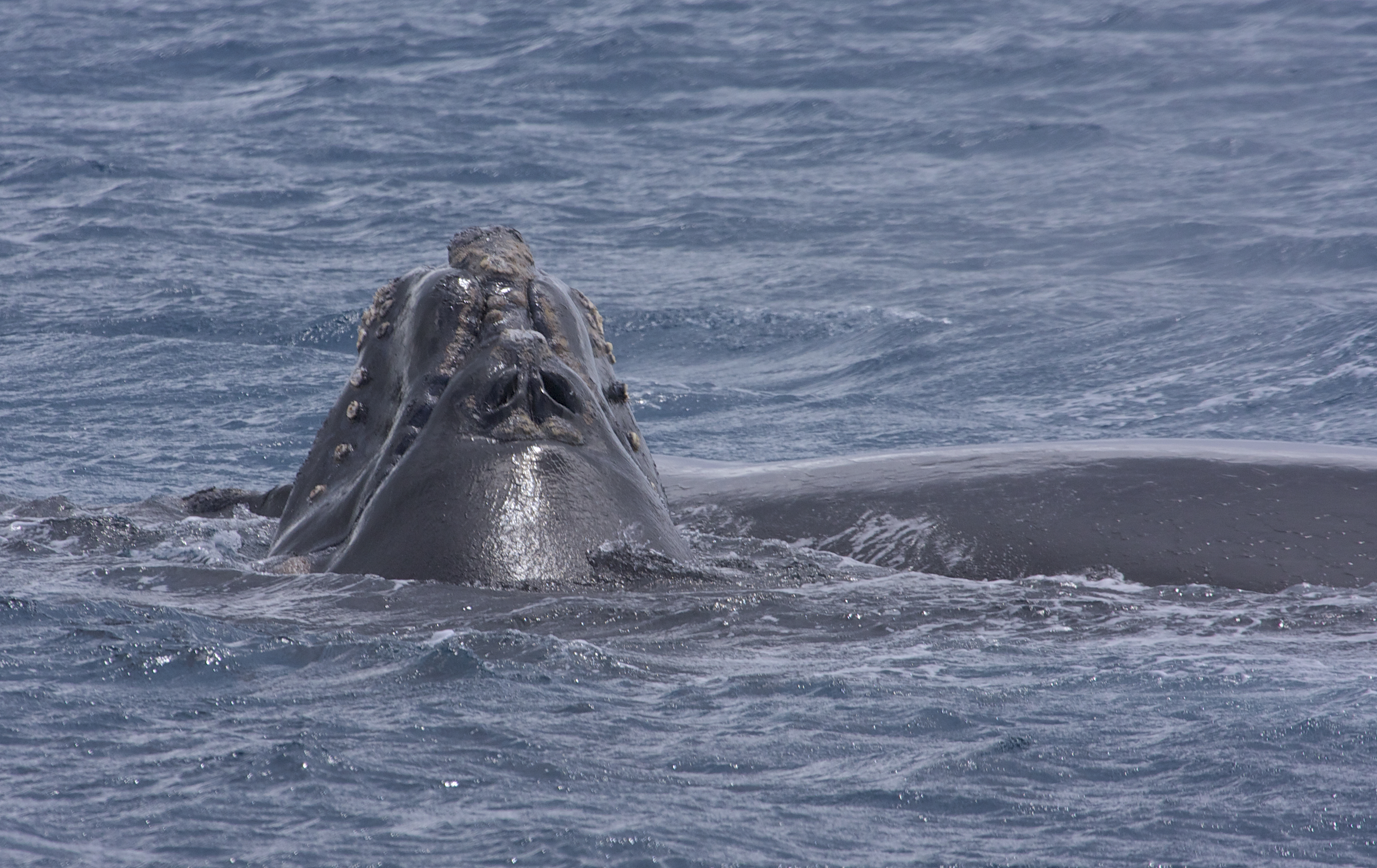
Southern right whales in the park

=== Mammals ===
The park is home to some of the rarest animals in Australia. Species found in the park include the quenda, ring tailed possums and one of the few mainland populations of quokkas.

Southern right whales inhabit the ocean off the coast.

In 2010, an insurance population of Gilbert's potoroo was established within an enclosure at the park, as a short-term measure; however, it was found in 2015 that native carpet pythons were getting into the enclosure and preying on the marsupials. As of December 2018 there were 20 of the critically endangered marsupials in the park, representing a fifth of the total remaining population in the world.

=== Birds ===
The park forms part of the Two Peoples Bay and Mount Manypeaks Important Bird Area, identified as such by BirdLife International because of its significance in the conservation of several rare and threatened bird species. The critically endangered noisy scrubbird, which was once thought to be extinct, is found within the park; a small population of 14 were translocated from Two Peoples Bay Nature Reserve in 1983, followed by another 16 in 1985. By 1994 it was estimated that 223 male birds had been heard singing in the area.

The western bristlebird is another vulnerable species that is found within the park. Most of the birds remaining population is found in Two Peoples Bay Nature Reserve and Waychinicup National Park. Populations of the bird that have been on the decline since the late 19th century has started to stabilise.

== See also ==
- Protected areas of Western Australia
