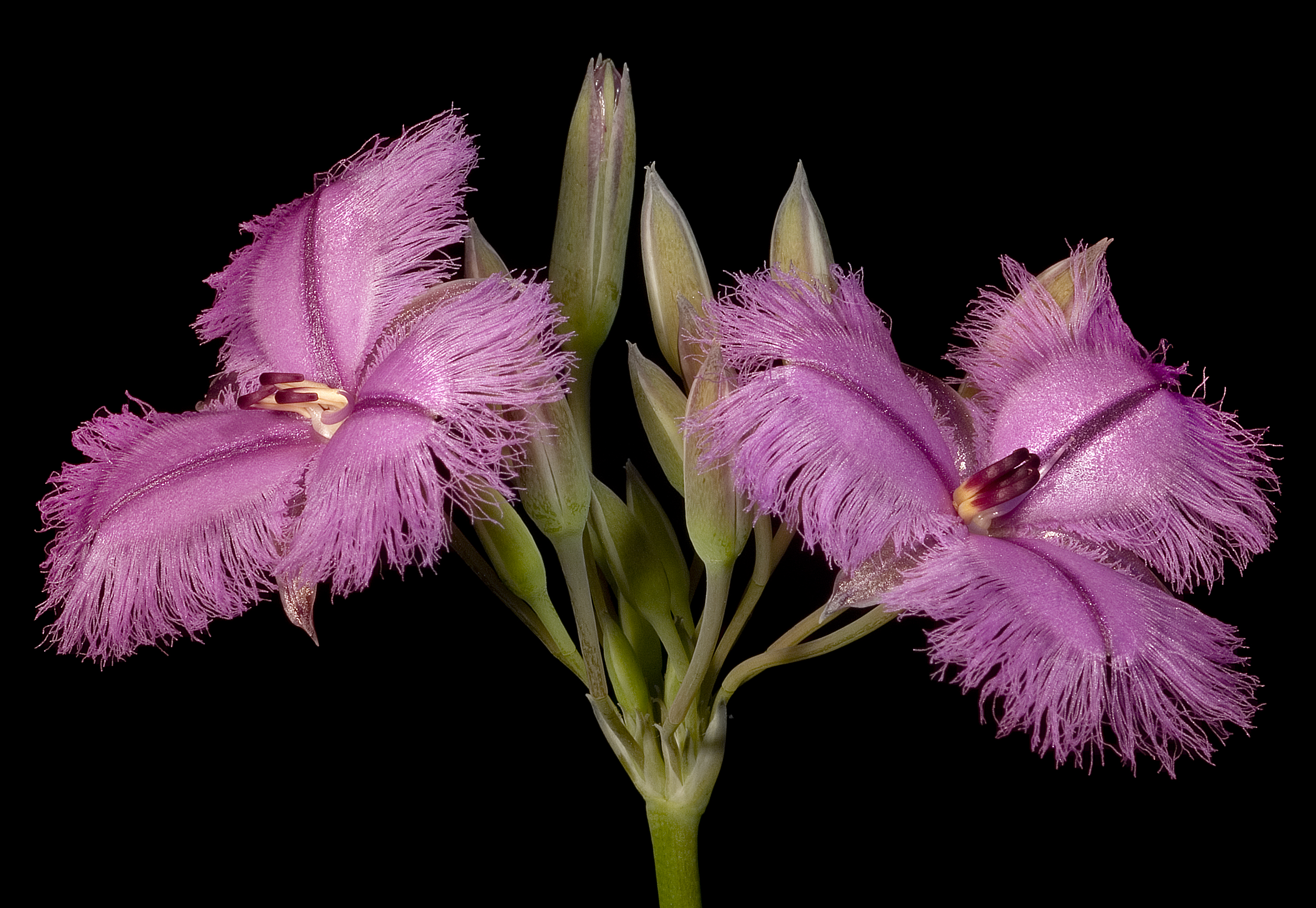

Scientific classification
- Kingdom: Plantae
- Clade: Tracheophytes
- Clade: Angiosperms
- Clade: Monocots
- Order: Asparagales
- Family: Asparagaceae
- Subfamily: Lomandroideae
- Genus: Thysanotus
- Species: T. multiflorus

Binomial name
- Thysanotus multiflorus R.Br.

Synonyms
- Chlamysporum multiflorum Steud. nom. inval., pro syn.; Chlamysporum multiflorum (R.Br.) Britten; Thysanotus brevipes Endl.; Thysanotus multiflorus R.Br. var. multiflorus; Thysanotus multiflorus var. prolifer (Lindl.) Benth.; Thysanotus prolifer Lindl.; Thysanotus proliferus Lindl. orth. var.

= Thysanotus multiflorus =

Species of flowering plant

Thysanotus multiflorus, commonly known as many-flowered fringe lily, is a species of flowering plant in the Asparagaceae family, and is endemic to the south-west of Western Australia. It is a tufted perennial herb, with linear to lance-shaped leaves, and usually a single umbel of four to 60 purple flowers with linear to lance-shaped sepals, elliptic, fringed petals and three stamens.

== Description ==
Thysanotus multiflorus is a tufted perennial herb with a small rootstock enclosed by old leaf bases and with fibrous roots. Its three to 30 leaves are linear to narrowly lance-shaped, flat to more or less channelled, 70–570 mm (2.8–22.4 in) long and 2–5 mm (0.079–0.197 in) wide. The flowers are usually borne in a single umbel with four to 60 purple flowers, occasionally with a second umbel 50–100 mm (2.0–3.9 in) below. Each flower is on a pedicel 6–28 mm (0.24–1.10 in) long. The perianth segments are 7–17 mm (0.28–0.67 in) long, the sepals linear to narrowly lance-shaped with the narrower end towards the base, 2.0–2.5 mm (0.079–0.098 in) wide. The petals are elliptic, 6–8 mm (0.24–0.31 in) wide, with a fringe 3.5–5 mm (0.14–0.20 in) long. There are three stamens, the anthers 5 mm (0.20 in) long and curved. The style is about 6 mm (0.24 in) long and curves in the opposite direction to the anthers. Flowering occurs from August to December or January, and the seeds are more or less cylindrical, 2 mm (0.079 in) long and 1.5 mm (0.059 in) in diameter with a stalked, yellow aril.

== Taxonomy ==
Thysanotus multiflorus was first formally described in 1810 by Robert Brown in his Prodromus Florae Novae Hollandiae. The specific epithet (multiflorus) means 'many-flowered'.

== Distribution and habitat ==
Many-flowered fringe lily grows in coastal banksia scrub forest in sand in Eucalyptus marginata-Corymbia calophylla forest and Eucalyptus staeri forest in humus-rich sandy soils. It is found south-east of a line from the Avon River to Cape Riche in the Avon Wheatbelt, Esperance Plains, Geraldton Sandplains, Jarrah Forest, Swan Coastal Plain and Warren IBRA regions of south-western Western Australia.

== Conservation status ==
Thysanotus multiflorus is listed as "not threatened" by the Government of Western Australia Department of Biodiversity, Conservation and Attractions.
