= Waychinicup River =

River in Western Australia

Coordinates: 34°53′25.64″S 118°19′55.16″E

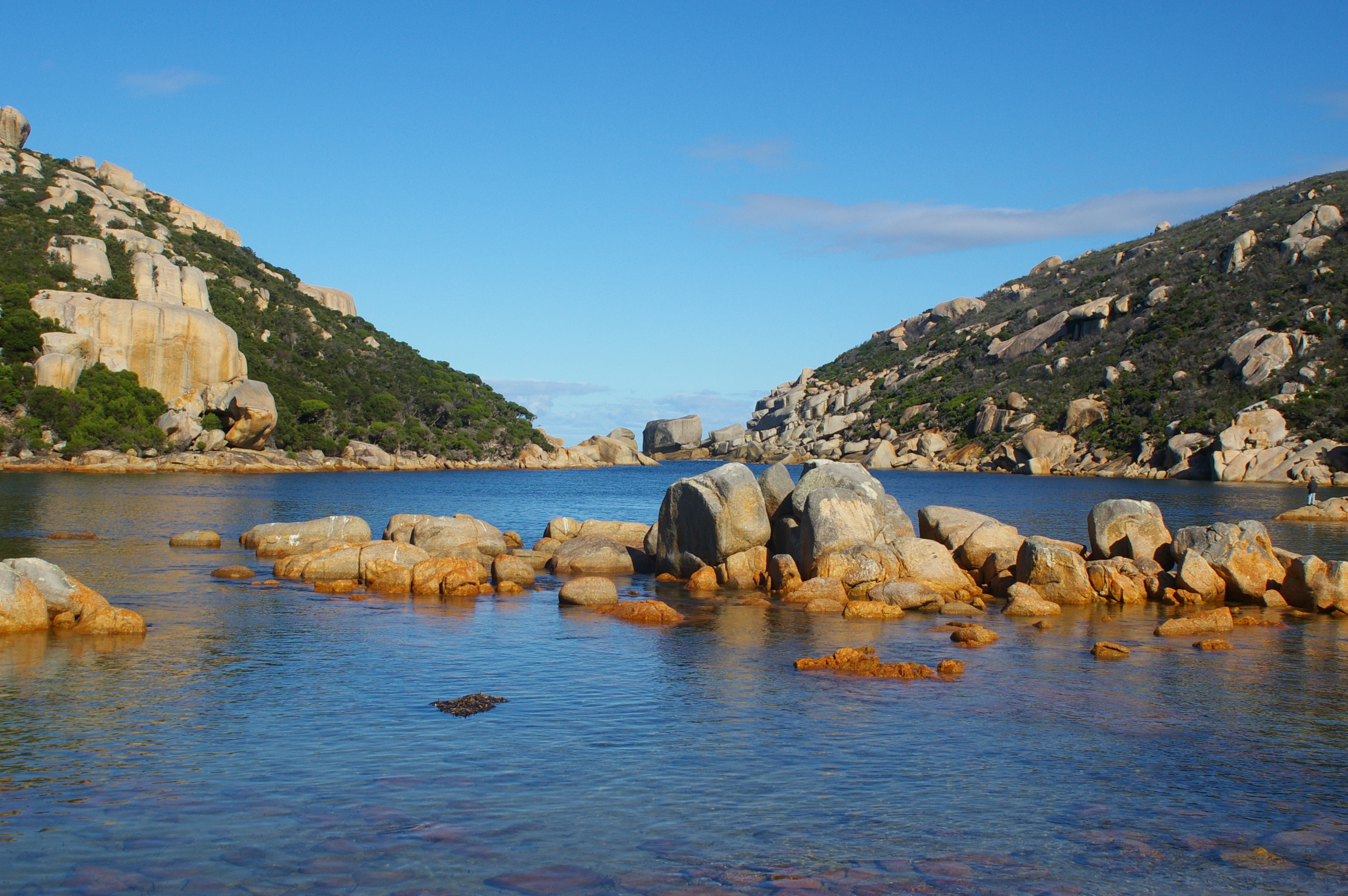
- Waychinicup Inlet

Location
- Country: Australia

Physical characteristics
- Source
  - location: near Manypeaks
  - elevation: 61 metres (200 ft)
- Mouth
  - location: Southern Ocean
- Length: 17 km (11 mi)
- Basin size: 145 km^{2} (56 sq mi)
- Discharge
  - average: 8,560 ML/a (0.271 m^{3}/s; 9.58 cu ft/s)

The Waychinicup River is located in the Great Southern region of Western Australia. The headwaters of the river are located near the town of Manypeaks along the South Coast Highway, with an elevation of approximately 100 metres (328 ft) above sea level and flows in a generally southerly direction through the Mount Manypeaks Range then through the Waychinicup National Park until it discharges into the Southern Ocean.

There is road access to the mouth of the river and it is located 65 kilometres (40 mi) from Albany, Western Australia.

The coastal part of the river is an estuary that is 130 metres (427 ft) long and less than 2 metres (7 ft) deep, it is well flushed by tidal and swell action of the ocean.
