= Styphelia pogonocalyx =

Conservation status
- Priority Four — Rare Taxa (DEC)

Scientific classification
- Kingdom: Plantae
- Clade: Tracheophytes
- Clade: Angiosperms
- Clade: Eudicots
- Clade: Asterids
- Order: Ericales
- Family: Ericaceae
- Genus: Styphelia
- Species: S. pogonocalyx

Binomial name
- Styphelia pogonocalyx F.Muell. ex Benth. F.Muell
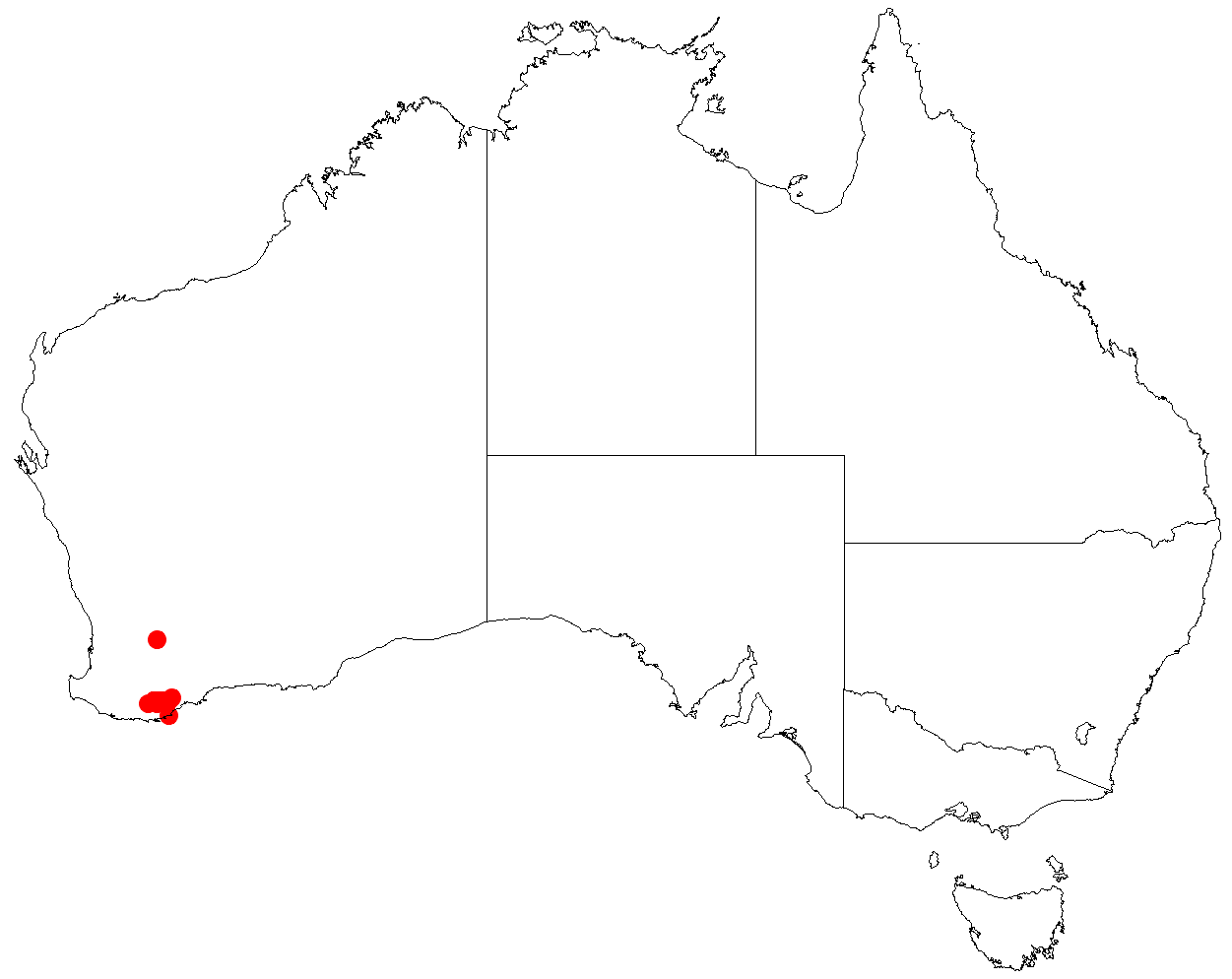
- Occurrence data from AVH

Synonyms
- Leucopogon pogonocalyx F.Muell. ex Benth.

Species of plant

Styphelia pogonocalyx is a species of flowering plant in the heath family Ericaceae and is endemic to a restricted part of the south-west of Western Australia. It is an erect shrub with wand-like branches. Its leaves are erect, egg-shaped, 4–6 mm (0.16–0.24 in) long with a rigid, sharply-pointed tip on the end. The flowers are borne in leaf axils in pairs or threes with bracts and broad bracteoles about one-third as long as the sepals. The sepals are about 2 mm (0.079 in) long with bearded edges, and the petals are about 4 mm (0.16 in) long, the petal lobes as long as the petal tube and densely bearded.

The species was first formally described in 1868 by George Bentham in Flora Australiensis from specimens collected by George Maxwell near Mount Manypeaks. In 1882, Ferdinand von Mueller transferred the species to Styphelia as S. pogopocalyx in his Systematic Census of Australian Plants. The specific epithet (pogonocalyx) means "bearded sepals".

Styphelia pogonocalyx is restricted to the Stirling Range National Park and nearby areas and is listed as "Priority Four" by the Government of Western Australia Department of Biodiversity, Conservation and Attractions, meaning that it is rare or near threatened. The species has not been collected at Mount Manypeaks since Maxwell's original collection, and the species is not common in the Stirling Ranges. If it is susceptible to Phytophthora cinnamomi, it may suffer significant further decline.
