= Hibbertia verrucosa =

Scientific classification
- Kingdom: Plantae
- Clade: Tracheophytes
- Clade: Angiosperms
- Clade: Eudicots
- Order: Dilleniales
- Family: Dilleniaceae
- Genus: Hibbertia
- Species: H. verrucosa

Binomial name
- Hibbertia verrucosa (Turcz.) Benth.

Species of flowering plant

Hibbertia verrucosa is a species of flowering plant in the family Dilleniaceae and is endemic to the south-west of Western Australia. It is a shrub with scattered, densely hairy, narrowly rectangular leaves and yellow flowers usually with ten stamens fused at the bases, all on one side of two densely softly-hairy carpels.

== Description ==
Hibbertia verrucosa is a shrub that typically grows to a height of 20–40 cm (7.9–15.7 in) and has branchlets covered with star-shaped hairs when young. The leaves are scattered, densely hairy, narrowly rectangular to linear, mostly 8–12 mm (0.31–0.47 in) long and 1–2 mm (0.039–0.079 in) wide on a petiole 0.2–0.5 mm (0.0079–0.0197 in) long. The flowers are arranged singly in upper leaf axils on a hairy peduncle 2–6 mm (0.079–0.236 in) long with hairy bracts 2–3 mm (0.079–0.118 in) long at the base. The five sepals are 5–6 mm (0.20–0.24 in) long, the five petals are yellow, broadly egg-shaped with the narrower end towards the base and 7–9 mm (0.28–0.35 in) long with a small notch at the tip. There are usually ten stamens, curving over two softly-hairy carpels that each contain two ovules. Flowering mostly occurs between August and December.

== Taxonomy ==
This hibbertia was first formally described in 1852 by Nikolai Turczaninow who gave it the name Pleurandra verrucosa in the Bulletin de la Société Impériale des Naturalistes de Moscou from specimens collected by James Drummond. In 1863, George Bentham changed the name to Hibbertia verrucosa in Flora Australiensis. The specific epithet (verrucosa) means "covered with warts".

== Distribution and habitat ==
This species grows in kwongan and heath on rocky outcrops and in sandpalins between Two Peoples Bay and the Cape Arid National Park with scattered populations in nearby areas, in the Avon Wheatbelt, Esperance Plains, Jarrah Forest and Mallee biogeographic regions of south-western Western Australia.

== Conservation status ==
Hibbertia verrucosa is classified as "not threatened" by the Western Australian Government Department of Parks and Wildlife.

== See also ==
- List of Hibbertia species
