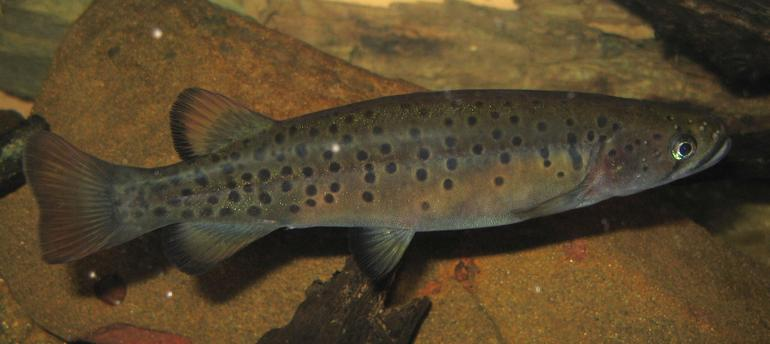
- Spotted galaxias. The characteristic base colouration and black edges to the fins are not particularly noticeable in this photo

Conservation status
- Least Concern (IUCN 3.1)

Scientific classification
- Kingdom: Animalia
- Phylum: Chordata
- Class: Actinopterygii
- Order: Galaxiiformes
- Family: Galaxiidae
- Genus: Galaxias
- Species: G. truttaceus

Binomial name
- Galaxias truttaceus Valenciennes, 1846

= Spotted galaxias =

Species of fish

Spotted galaxias (Galaxias truttaceus) is a largish, primarily-freshwater galaxias species found in southern Australia. They are a somewhat tubular, deep-bodied fish, with a dusky brownish-red colouration overlain with dark, haloed spots, dramatic black edges to dorsal, anal and pelvic fins, and a dark diagonal stripe through the eye.

== Distribution ==
Spotted galaxias has a very wide distribution, being found in southern Victoria, all of Tasmania, offshore islands in between, as well as south-west Western Australia.

On the mainland spotted galaxias is generally recognised as a freshwater fish species with a marine larval phase (larvae are swept out to sea and return to freshwater habitats as early stage juveniles), and thus only found in coastal rivers. Spotted galaxias are generally found in coastal rivers in Tasmania as well, however natural landlocked populations do occur in some freshwater lakes in Tasmania.

Spotted galaxias were assumed not to be native to the Murray-Darling river system, however records of native fish fauna compiled by William Blandowski in the 1850s suggest the species did historically occur there. This may cause a re-evaluation of the spotted galaxias specimens occasionally recovered in the Murray-Darling river system, which until now were assumed to be accidental translocations via the Snowy Mountains Hydro-Electric Scheme.

In Western Australia, spotted galaxias are limited to the Goodga, Angove, and Kent river catchments on the southern coast. All three catchments drain to coastal lakes which are only connected to the ocean during the winter season in wet years.

== Habitat, diet, and reproduction ==
Spotted galaxias, in their juvenile and adult stages, inhabit coastal rivers at low to medium altitude. They prefer cool, flowing rivers in forested catchments with excellent riparian vegetation, good water quality and cover in the form of boulders, sunken logs and overhanging banks.

Spotted galaxias are a predatory fish, feeding in the currents or "drift" similar to exotic trout species. Their diet consists mainly of aquatic and terrestrial invertebrates.

Spawning occurs in winter in rivers. Larvae are swept out to sea and return and migrate back up rivers as early-stage juveniles which initially do not resemble adult fish. Returning juveniles are sometimes intercepted by humans as whitebait, and were severely overfished in previous decades. Landlocked lake populations spawn in spring.

== Human use ==
Before the introduction of exotic trout species to Australia, an introduction that has caused severe problems for the conservation of Australian native fish, spotted galaxias were keenly fished for by early Australian anglers using fly-fishing gear. The species was appreciated for its beauty, its willingness to take wet and dry flies, its game fighting ability on very light tackle, and its relatively large size by galaxias standards, sometimes reaching 30 cm, and commonly 20 cm. (Spotted galaxias appear to have had a larger average size before the introduction of exotic trout species.) A handful of fly-fishers in Australia are now re-discovering the pleasure of fly-fishing for this magnificent native fish with ultra-light fly-fishing tackle.

As mentioned above, early-stage juveniles returning to estuaries were and sometimes still are netted as white bait, which are caught for human consumption.

With their beautiful appearance spotted galaxias have potential as aquarium fish, but do require cool water.

== Conservation ==
Spotted galaxias are threatened by dams and weirs blocking migration and fragmenting river habitats, irresponsible forestry and farming practices that degrade river environments through siltation and other effects, and competition and predation by exotic trout species.

In Tasmanian rivers spotted galaxias numbers are severely depressed when exotic trout species are present (Ault & White, 1994). This is a common phenomena; galaxias species that manage to survive the presence of exotic trout (many species do not) such as spotted galaxias are forced into sub-optimal feeding locations, feeding times and diets by aggressive competition from exotic trout species (McDowall, 2006). Galaxias populations in such situations tend to display lower than normal growth, size and fecundity, raising concerns for their long-term future (McDowall, 2006).

In southern Victoria however many recreational fishermen report that spotted galaxias are found only in the few trout-free streams remaining. Spotted galaxias appear to reach a larger maximum size in these few trout-free streams than in Tasmania. A lack of exotic-trout-free habitat reserved for spotted galaxias and other native fish species in south-eastern Australia generally is a major concern.
