= Coffin Island =

Island in Western Australia

Geography
- Coordinates: 34°59′56.55″S 118°12′46.27″E

Administration
- Australia

Coffin Island is an island in the Great Southern region of Western Australia. The island is 300 metres (984 ft) offshore from Two Peoples Bay Nature Reserve and the island is also a protected area making up part of the reserve. With an area of 28 hectares (69 acres) the island is made up mostly of granite.

== Fauna ==
Coffin Island forms part of the Two Peoples Bay and Mount Manypeaks Important Bird Area, identified as such by BirdLife International because of its significance in the conservation of several rare and threatened bird species. The island is recognised as a breeding site for great-winged petrels. Other seabirds such as flesh-footed shearwaters and little penguins also have colonies on the island. The island also provides haul-out sites for New Zealand fur seals with a population of approximately 100 being recorded on the island in 1990. Australian sea lions also make use of the island in smaller numbers.

== Flora ==
The island has sufficient soil accumulated over its surface to support Berry Saltbush heathland.
