= Angove River =

River in Western Australia

Coordinates: 34°56′21″S 118°10′1″E

Location
- Country: Australia

Physical characteristics
- Source
  - location: Water Reserve 13802
- Mouth
  - location: Angove Lake
- Length: 9 km (5.6 mi)
- Basin size: 29 km^{2} (11 sq mi)
- Discharge
  - average: 1,880 ML/a (2.10 cu ft/s)

The Angove River or Angove Creek is a river in the Great Southern region of Western Australia; most of the river is found within Two Peoples Bay Nature Reserve.

The stream was seen in 1898 by surveyor William Angove, and was named after him in 1913 by another surveyor, B. W. Ridley.

The river rises in swamps north of the water supply reserve then enter the reserve, where a pipehead dam is located to provide potable water to Albany. It then flows through a gauging weir then enters Two Peoples Bay Nature Reserve. It continues through a 3-kilometre (2 mi) channel that is on private land and was constructed to drain nearby farm land. The river eventually discharges into Angove Lake.

The water is of excellent quality and is considered as fresh, potable water. As of 2008 only 5% of the catchment area had been cleared, mostly in the very upper reaches and around the lake. The catchment area is one of the few areas of Albany blackbutt woodland left in Australia and is considered to be an important biological link between Two Peoples Bay and Mount Manypeaks.

The river is used to supply water to the town of Albany, which is located 29 kilometres (18 mi) west of the river. As of 2004 a total of 1,600 megalitres (2,092,721 cu yd) of water was being taken from the river every year.

Fish ladders have been installed in the river in an effort to minimise disruption to fish migration patterns.
