= Lake Pleasant View System Important Bird Area =

Lakes in Western Australia

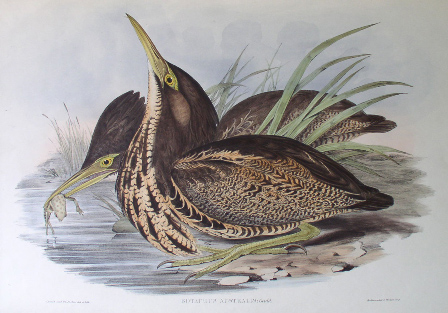
- The IBA is an important site for Australasian bitterns
- Interactive map of Lake Pleasant View System Important Bird Area
- Location: Manypeaks, Western Australia
- Coordinates: 34°48′17″S 118°10′59″E

The Lake Pleasant View System Important Bird Area comprises three shallow freshwater lakes, about five kilometres apart from each other. The lakes lie near the town of Manypeaks, and 35 km north-east of Albany, in the Great Southern region of south-west Western Australia.

== Description ==
The lakes include Lake Pleasant View, with North Sister East and North Sister West Lakes. They are characterised by closed communities of sedges forming freshwater marshes on peat substrates. The lake margins support other species of wetland plants as well as saltwater paperbark open shrubland.

== Birds ==
The three lakes, with a collective area of 434 hectares (1,070 acres), have been identified by BirdLife International as an Important Bird Area (IBA) because they support a population of the endangered Australasian bittern, with up to ten breeding pairs present. The IBA supports large numbers of little grassbirds, while western rosellas, red-capped parrots, red-winged fairy-wrens, western thornbills, western spinebills and red-eared firetails occur in the surrounding bushland.
