= Two Peoples Bay and Mount Manypeaks Important Bird Area =

Important Bird Area in Western Australia

Coordinates: 34°54′02″S 118°14′29″E

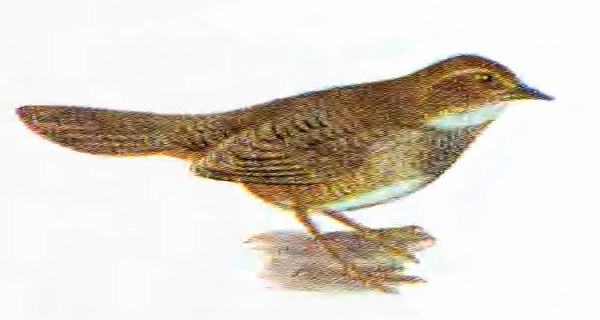
The IBA is an important area for noisy scrub-birds ...

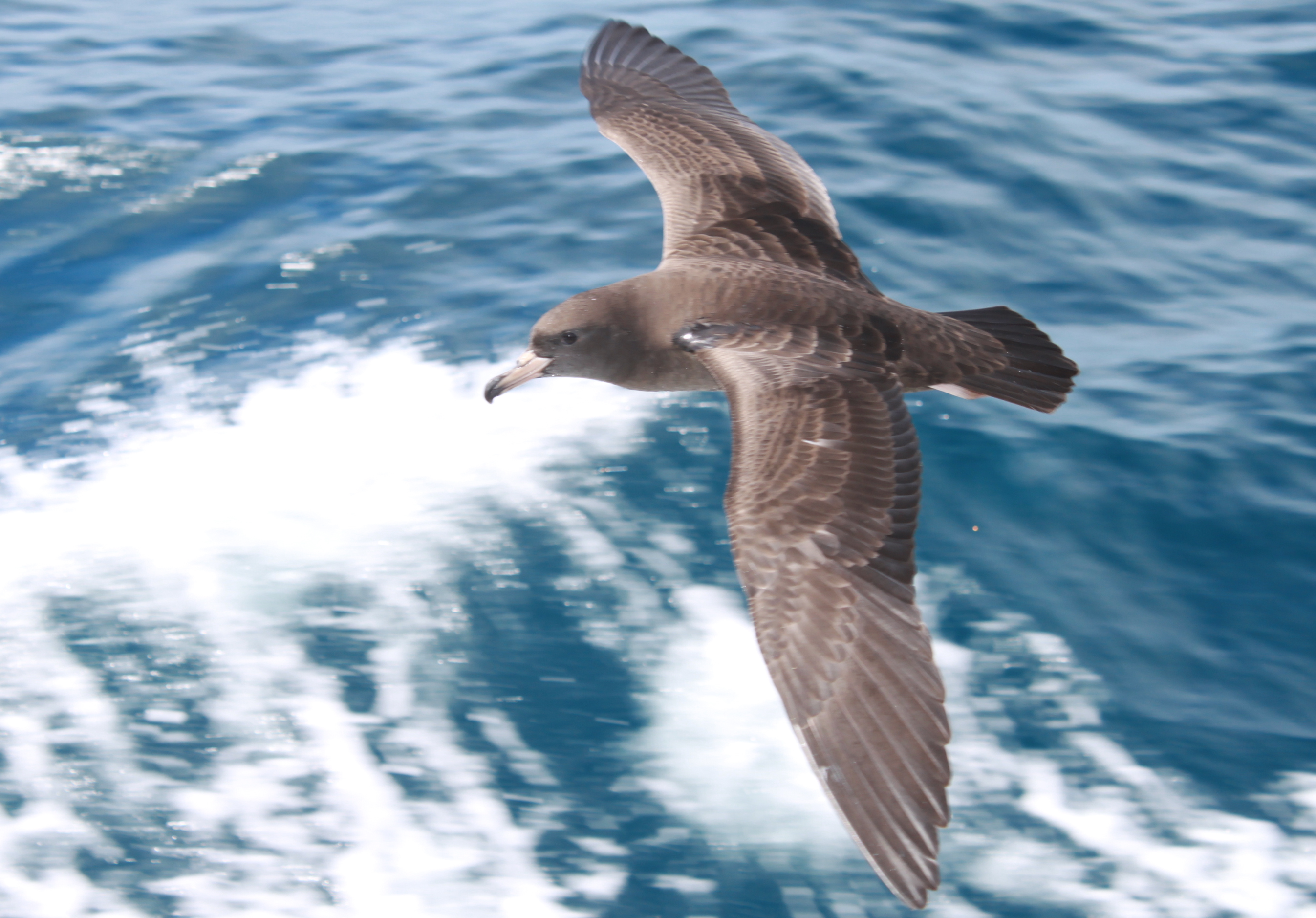
... for flesh-footed shearwaters ...

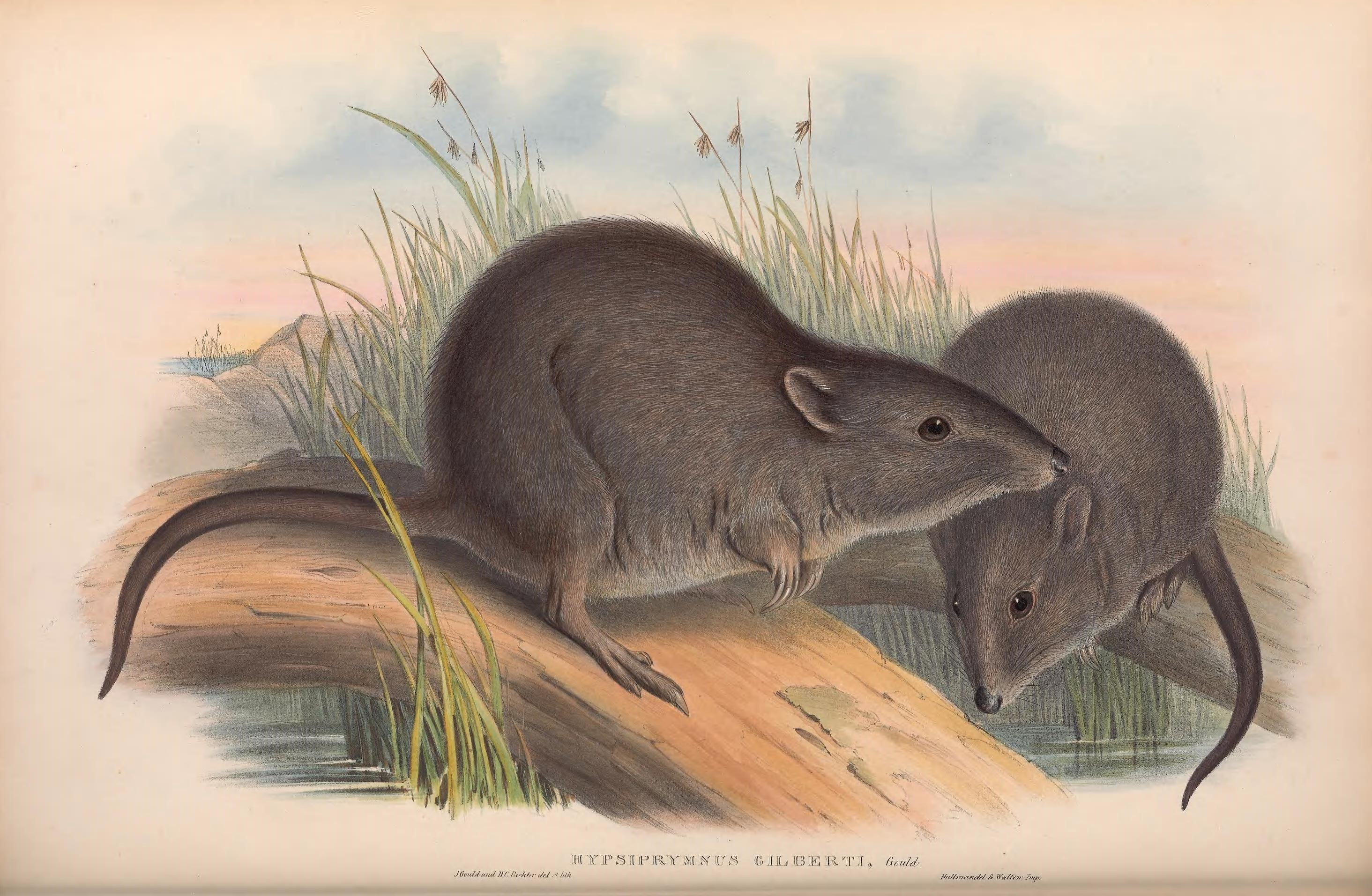
... and for Gilbert's potoroos

The Two Peoples Bay and Mount Manypeaks Important Bird Area is a 26,100-hectare (101 sq mi) tract of coastal and subcoastal land east of the city of Albany in south-west Western Australia. It is an important site for the conservation of several rare and threatened birds.

== Description ==
The Important Bird Area (IBA) contains a 50-kilometre (31 mi) length of coastal heathland habitat. It encompasses the Two Peoples Bay, Mount Manypeaks, Arpenteur and Bald Island Nature Reserves, together with Waychinicup National Park and adjacent unprotected land with suitable habitat. It has a temperate climate supporting dense shrubland and heathland subject to occasional wildfires. It also contains a series of coastal wetlands, comprising Moates, Gardner and Angove Lakes, as well as Coffin Island which, with Bald Island, supports seabird colonies.

== Birds ==
The site has been identified as an IBA by BirdLife International because it contains almost the entire population of noisy scrub-birds, a large proportion of western bristlebirds and most of the western subspecies of western whipbirds. It also supports over 1% of the world populations of flesh-footed shearwaters and, probably, of great-winged petrels, as well as significant numbers of Carnaby's black cockatoos, Australasian bitterns, western rosellas, red-capped and rock parrots, red-winged fairywrens, western spinebills, western thornbills, white-breasted robins and red-eared firetails. Hooded plovers are regularly seen. Mammals found in the IBA include Gilbert's potoroos, quokkas, western ringtail possums, honey possums, western brush wallabies and quendas.
