= Stephen Lackey Kessell =

Conservator of forests in Australia (1897–1979)

Stephen Lackey Kessell (1897–1979), known as Kim Kessell, was a conservator of forests in Australia.

Born 17 March 1897, Wollongong, New South Wales, Married 1924 at Christ Church, Claremont to Barbara Morton Sawell, a pharmacist who died in 1978. He died 29 June 1979 at Armadale, Melbourne, was cremated, and left property amounting to around half a million dollars. Kessell left military service in 1920 to serve under the beleaguered Conservator of forest, Charles Lane Poole, assuming his role after Poole resigned in October 1921 until his official appointment in January 1923; Kessell held this position for twenty years and attempted to implement the programs forestry management established by his predecessor. While regarded as less forthright he was scathing in his criticism of contemporary practices,

… the Anglo-Saxon settlers who populated Australia brought with them no traditions of forestry as a rural industry, and for 100 years or more the forests were looked upon as an enemy to be slaughtered. — Kim Kessell, quoted by Roe, M. Australian Dictionary of Biography

As Western Australian Conservator he employed untrained individuals to manage plantations and forest regeneration, developed fire strategies, both defensive and introduced as a form of silvacultural management, and sought to found his departments methods on scientific and international standards of forestry. Kessell presided over the Institute of Foresters of Australia between 1936 and 1938, a body he had acted to found in 1935.

He was appointed as controller of timber at the Department of Munitions in 1941, successfully introducing a national tree policy. His criticism of Tasmanian forest policy in 1944 stated that the department and forests were compromised by private interests, his identification of Australian Newsprint Mills new operations at Boyer, Tasmania saw his appointment as managing director in 1946 in an effort to ameliorate the political consequences. He oversaw improvements to practices and overcame national shortages to improve the sustainability of the mills production, although his recommendation to expand operations in 1958 was unsuccessful. He retired from the A.N.M. board in 1962.

Amongst Kessell's legacies in improving forestry in the nation was the incorporation of the Australian Forestry School into the Australian National University. He was a member of the Weld Club, the Tasmanian Club, and eventually Australian Club, deputy of the National Safety Council, and appointed M.B.E. in 1951.
