= Manypeaks, Western Australia =

Town in the City of Albany, Western Australia

Manypeaks
- Town
- Interactive map of Manypeaks
- Coordinates: 34°50′17″S 118°10′19″E
- Country: Australia
- State: Western Australia
- Region: Great Southern
- LGA: City of Albany
- Location: 434 km (270 mi) SE of Perth; 38 km (24 mi) NE of Albany
- Established: 1951

Government
  - State electorate: Albany
  - Federal division: O'Connor

Area
  - Total: 295.5 km^{2} (114.1 sq mi)

Population
  - Total: 149 (SAL 2021)
- Postcode: 6328

Manypeaks is a town and locality of the City of Albany in the Great Southern region of Western Australia. It is located 434 km south-east of Perth and 38 km north-east of Albany. The township is on the South Coast Highway close to the intersection with Howie Road. The closest towns to Manypeaks are both on the South Coast highway and are Albany to the south-west and Wellstead to the east. The town lies close to the three lakes of the Lake Pleasant View System Important Bird Area.

== History ==
The government of Western Australia first developed the area in 1949 as part of the Many Peaks Land Settlement project and established the townsite. The name Manypeaks was taken from the distinctive peak of Mount Manypeaks that is situated about 10 km from the townsite. The town was gazetted in 1951.
