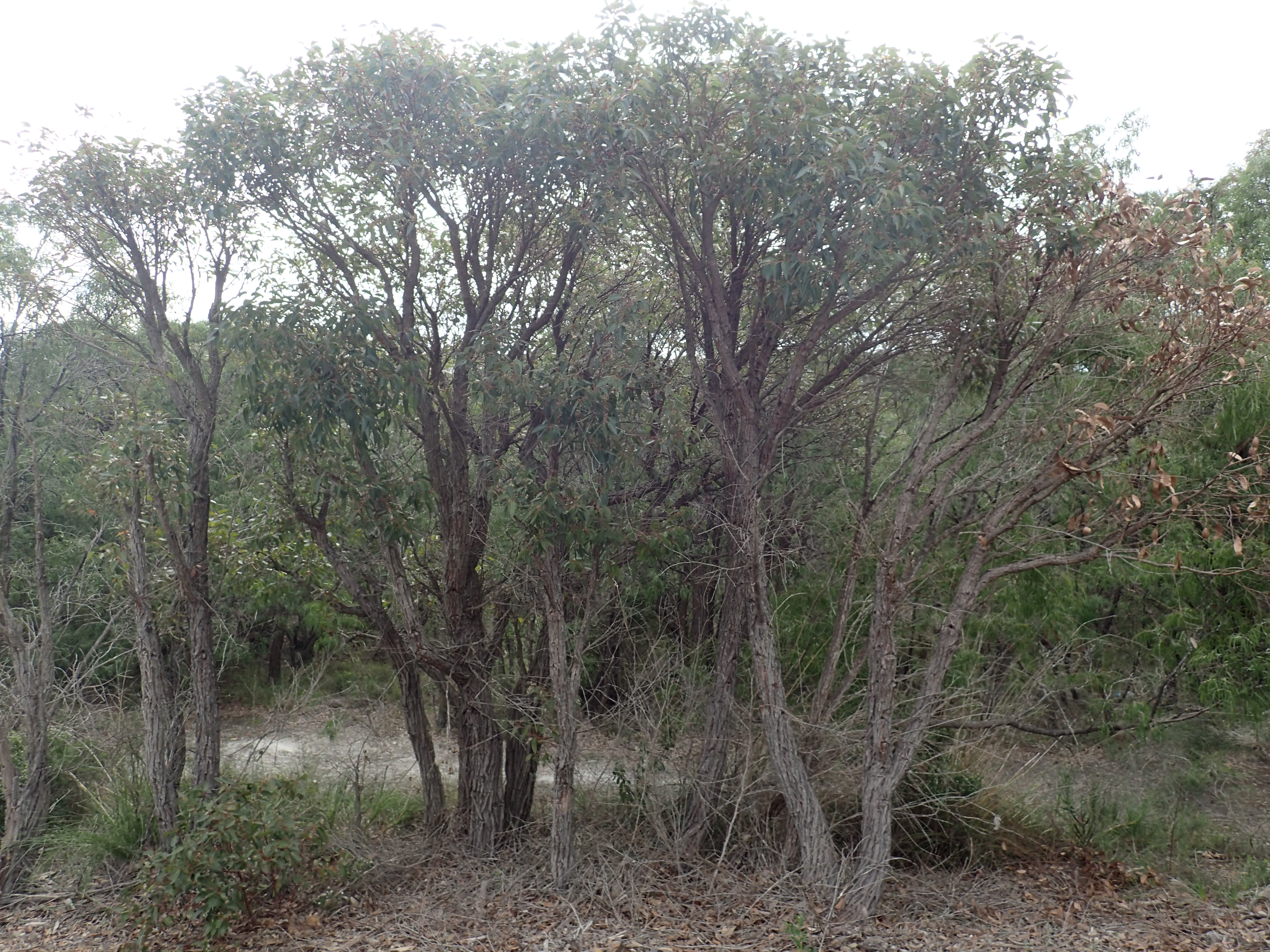
- Eucalyptus staeri in the Torndirrup National Park

Conservation status
- Near Threatened (IUCN 3.1)

Scientific classification
- Kingdom: Plantae
- Clade: Tracheophytes
- Clade: Angiosperms
- Clade: Eudicots
- Clade: Rosids
- Order: Myrtales
- Family: Myrtaceae
- Genus: Eucalyptus
- Species: E. staeri

Binomial name
- Eucalyptus staeri (Maiden) Kessell & C.A.Gardner

Synonyms
- Eucalyptus marginata var. staeri Maiden

= Eucalyptus staeri =

Albany blackbutt

Species of eucalyptus

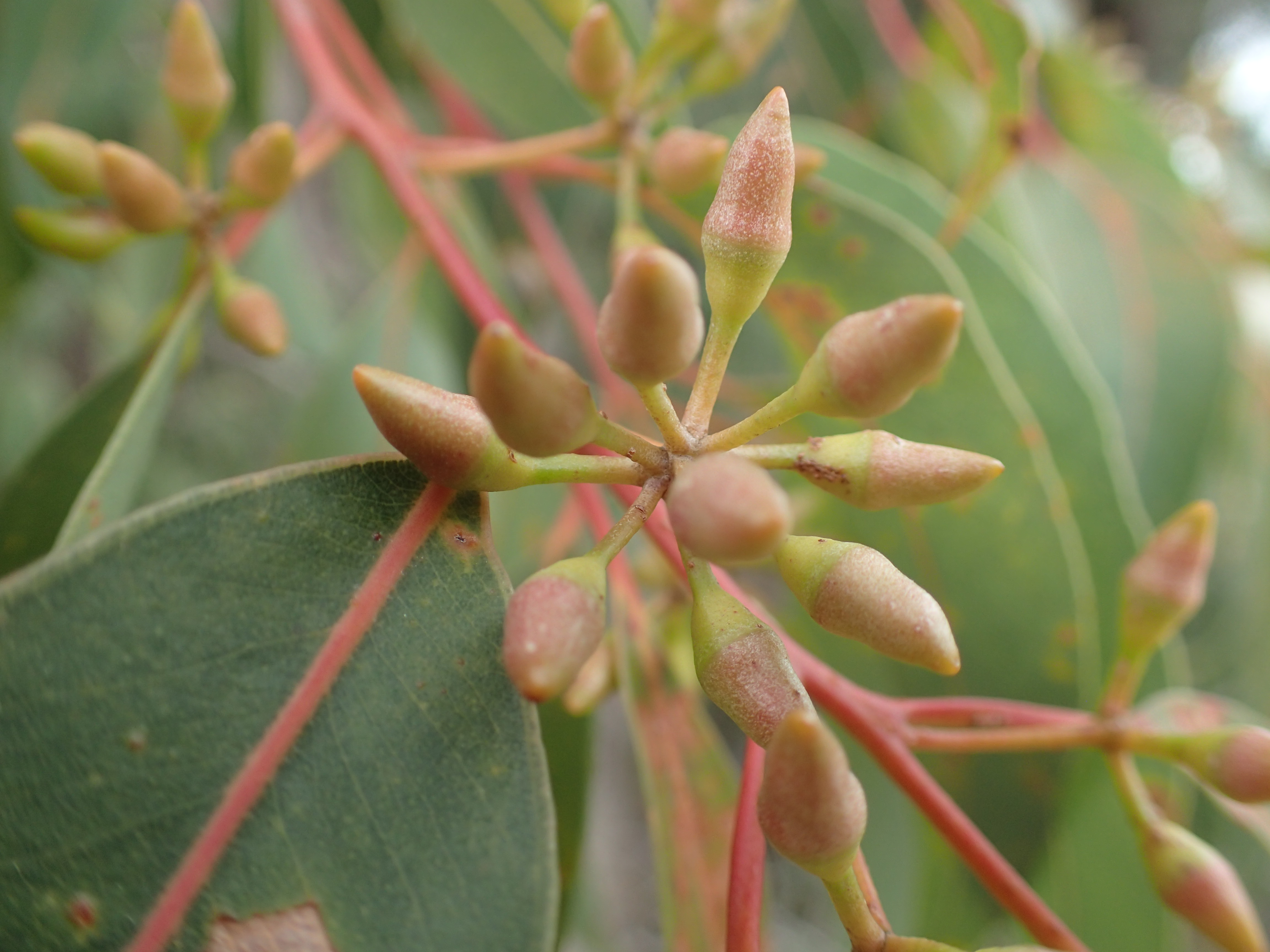
Flower buds

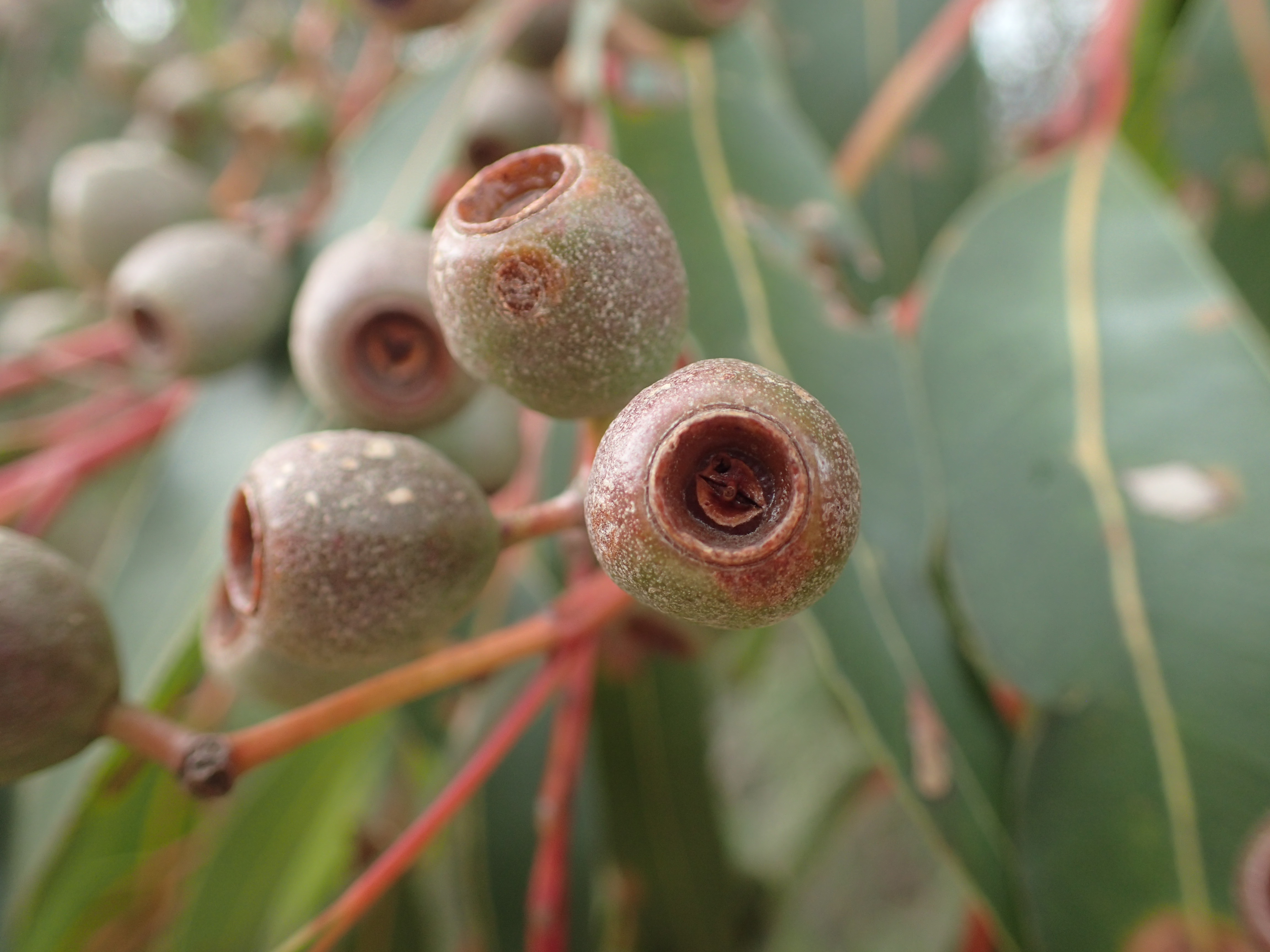
Fruit

Eucalyptus staeri, commonly known as Albany blackbutt, is a species of small tree or a mallee and is endemic to the south-west corner of Western Australia. It has rough bark on the trunk and branches, thick, lance-shaped adult leaves, flowers buds in groups of between seven and fifteen, creamy white flowers and shortened spherical fruit.

== Description ==
Eucalyptus staeri is a tree or a mallee that typically grows to a height of 2–15 m (6 ft 7 in – 49 ft 3 in) and forms a lignotuber. It has rough, fibrous, fissured, greyish brown bark on the trunk and branches thicker than about 40 mm (1.6 in). Young plants and coppice regrowth have stems that are square in cross-section and leaves that are a lighter shade of green on the lower side, egg-shaped to broadly lance-shaped, 80–140 mm (3.1–5.5 in) long and 30–60 mm (1.2–2.4 in) wide. Adult leaves are the same shade of green on both sides, lance-shaped, 80–125 mm (3.1–4.9 in) long and 18–35 mm (0.71–1.38 in) wide on a petiole 10–23 mm (0.39–0.91 in) long. The flower buds are arranged in leaf axils in groups of between seven and fifteen on a flattened, unbranched peduncle 14–23 mm (0.55–0.91 in) long, the individual buds on pedicels 5–19 mm (0.20–0.75 in) long. Mature buds are cylindrical to spindle-shaped, 13–20 mm (0.51–0.79 in) long and 5–7 mm (0.20–0.28 in) wide with a conical operculum. Flowering occurs from August or October to December or January or April and the flowers are creamy white. The fruit is a woody, shortened spherical capsule 14–23 mm (0.55–0.91 in) long and 16–22 mm (0.63–0.87 in) wide with the valves below rim level.

== Taxonomy and naming ==
Albany blackbutt was first formally described in 1914 by Joseph Maiden in the Journal and Proceedings of the Royal Society of New South Wales and given the name Eucalyptus marginata var. staeri. In 1924 Stephen Lackey Kessell and Charles Gardner raised the variety to species status as Eucalyptus staeri. The specific epithet (staeri) honours John Staer (1850-1933) who collected the type specimens.

== Distribution and habitat ==
Eucalyptus staeri is found mostly in the south west corner of the Great Southern region of Western Australia centred around the town of Albany with smaller populations extending north into the Wheatbelt. The preferred habitat is sandy soil in near-coastal scrubland.

== Conservation status ==
This eucalypt is classified as "not threatened" by the Western Australian Government Department of Parks and Wildlife. In 2019 the International Union for the Conservation of Nature listed E. staeri as a near threatened species noting that although it has a severely fragmented population and a declining number of mature individuals it has an estimated area of occurrence of 14,000 km^{2} (5,400 sq mi) and an estimated area of occupancy of 336 km^{2} (130 sq mi).

== See also ==
- List of Eucalyptus species
