= Two Peoples Bay Nature Reserve =

Nature reserve in Western Australia

- IUCN category IV (habitat/species management area)
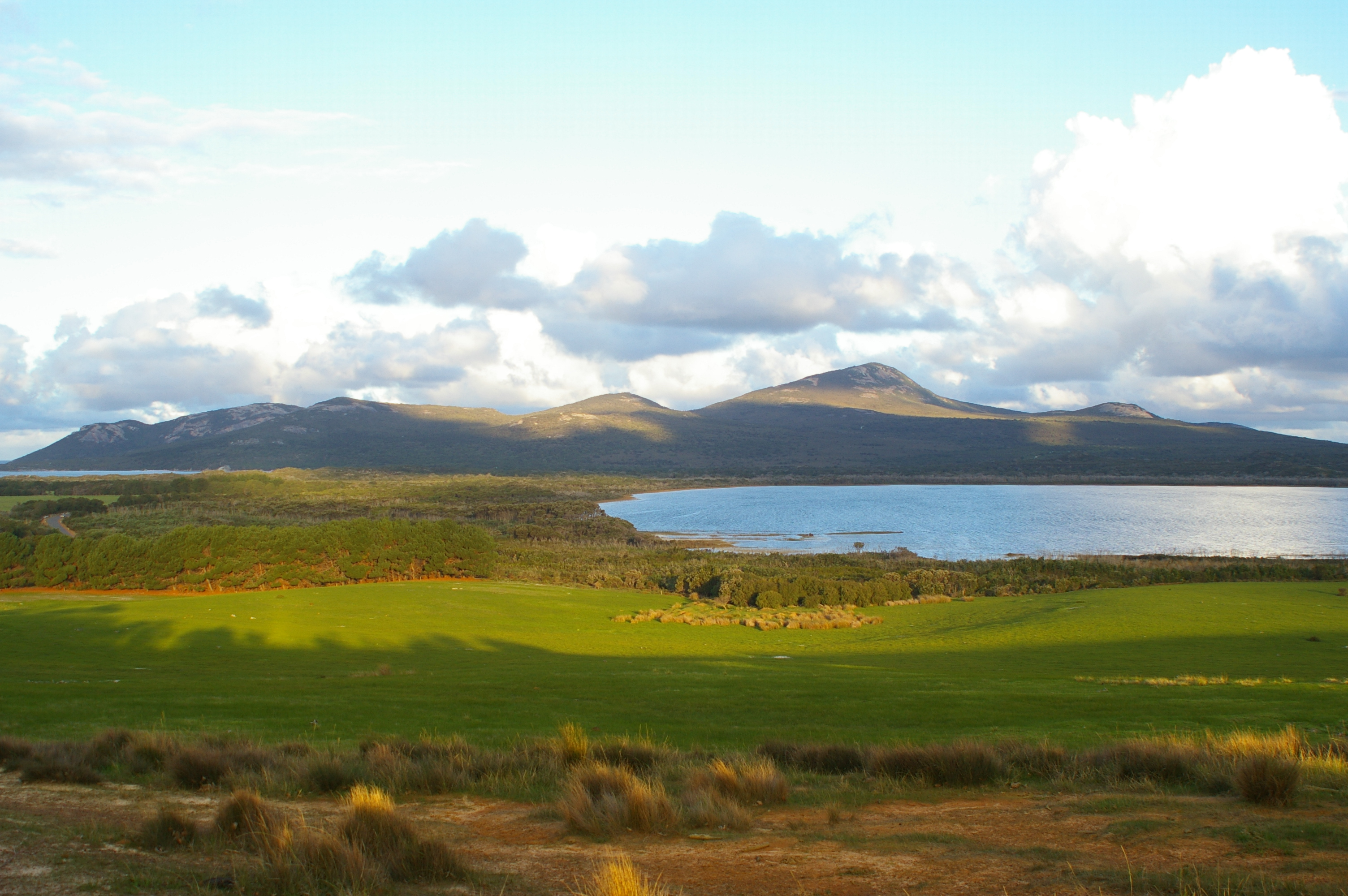
- View of the southern part of the reserve from Two Peoples Bay

- Location within Western Australia
- Location: Western Australia
- Nearest city: Albany
- Coordinates: 34°59′21.8″S 118°11′2.41″E
- Area: 47.45 km^{2} (18.32 sq mi)
- Established: 22 April 1966
- Governing body: Department of Parks and Wildlife

Two Peoples Bay Nature Reserve is a protected area managed by the Department of Parks and Wildlife and situated 35 kilometres (22 mi) east of Albany, Western Australia. The area is accessible by 2WD vehicles. The bay itself, including two small secluded beaches, faces due east and is protected from the Southern Ocean by a headland formed by the granite massif of Mount Gardner. The nature reserve was established in 1967 to protect the threatened noisy scrub-bird and its habitat. It is known for being the site of the discovery and naming of Gilbert's potoroo. However, in 2015, a huge fire destroyed 90% of the tiny marsupial's habitat, as well as killing three-quarters of the remaining small population.

Little Beach is a popular tourist attraction.

== History ==
The name Two Peoples Bay is from an incident in 1803 when an American whaling ship used the sheltered waters to lay anchor at the same time as a French vessel that was exploring the coastline east of Albany. It was named Baie Des Deux Peuples, 'bay of two nations', by a French expedition led by Nicholas Baudin in celebration of meeting the American whaler at this point.

John Gilbert, a naturalist, surveyed the area in the 1840s; he gave his name to the Gilbert's potoroo. Whaling activities were conducted in the bay during the middle of the 19th century. Two Peoples Bay was declared a nature reserve in 1967.

A bush fire broke out on private land near the reserve on 12 October 2012. Following a sudden change in wind direction, a truck carrying two of the fire crew was engulfed in flames; they were badly burned. Over 1,000 hectares (2,500 acres) of bushland were burnt, and one of the firefighters later died.

In late November 2015 a fire burnt through 1,200 hectares (2,965 acres) of the reserve. This fire destroyed an estimated 90% of the Gilbert's potoroo habitat, and killing around 15 of the estimated 20 Gilbert's potoroos living within the reserve. The department's chief research scientist said that it would be about 20 years before the habitat had recovered enough to support another population of the small marsupial.

== Extent and geographic features ==
The total area enclosed by the nature reserve is 4,744.7 hectares (11,724 acres). It may be divided into three areas:

- A main section of 4,510 hectares (11,144 acres) that contains Mount Gardner, Lake Gardner, Moates Lake, rocky shoreline of Sinkers Reef, granite headlands, sandy beaches such as Little Beach and Waterfall Beach and mobile dunes;
- A smaller section of 89 hectares (220 acres) that is about 2 kilometres (1 mi) north of the main area that includes the northern portion of Angove lake and the Angove River; and
- Four islands: Coffin Island, Black Rock, Inner Island and Rock Dunder. These range in size from 3 hectares (7.4 acres) to 28 hectares (69 acres).

Angove Lake is part of the Moates Lake System, along with Moates Lake and Lake Gardner. All of these lakes were linked to form a large estuarine system during the last interglacial period approximately 120,000 years ago.

== Flora and fauna ==
=== Plants ===
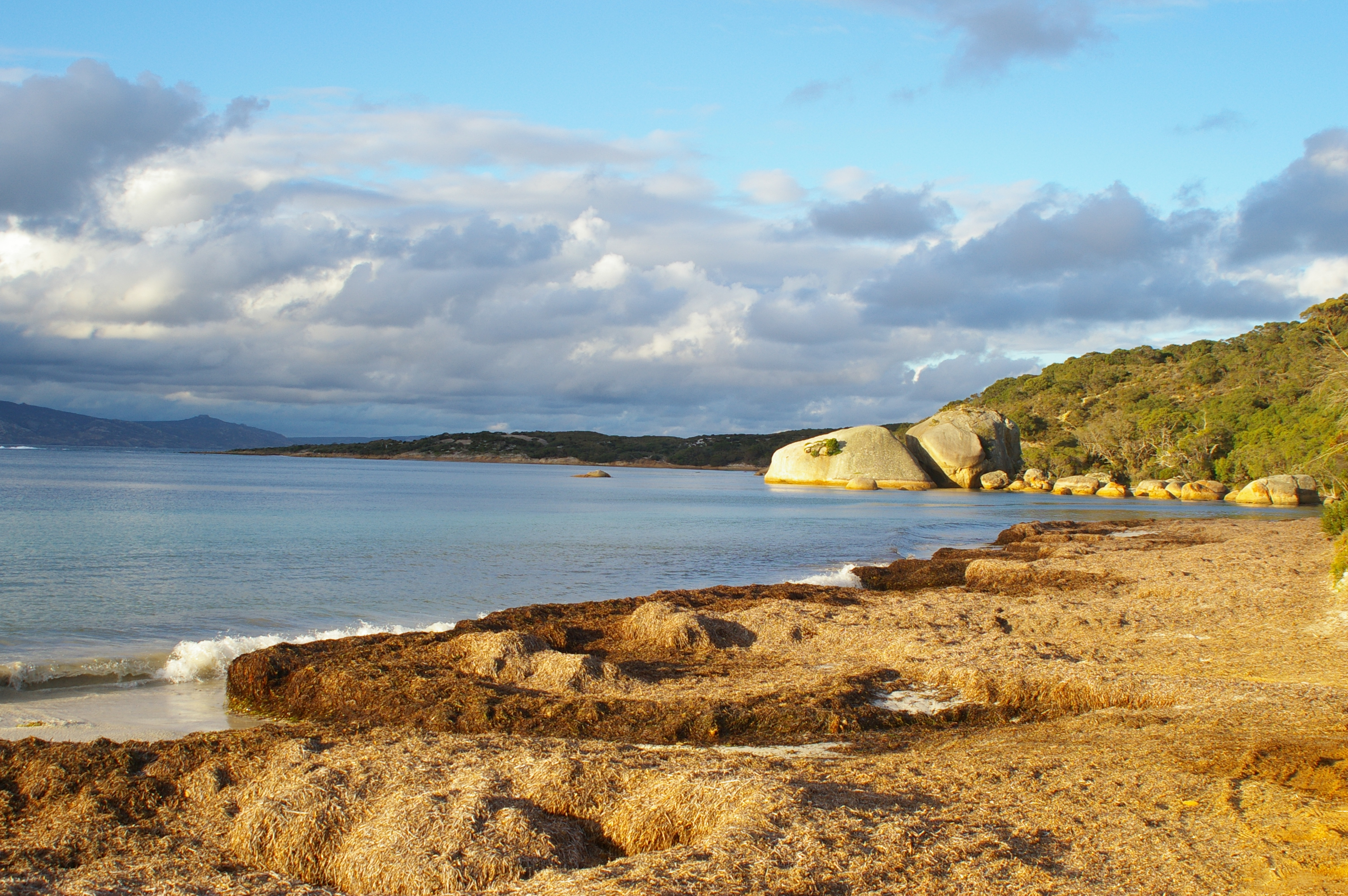
Far western end of Two Peoples Bay proper

The vegetation that is found in the park can be classified as follows: low forest is found north of Moates Lake, the wetland margins and close to the reserve offices. The trees reach 15 metres (49 ft) in height and are dominated by Eucalyptus species including coast gum, jarrah and yate as well as other species such as marri and juniper myrtle.

The understorey of the low forest includes species such as swamp banksia, pea-flowered narrow-leaved water bush and the porungurup wattle. Low woodlands in the broad valleys north of Moates Lake mainly consist of Albany blackbutt and the area between Moates Lake and Gardiner Lake is mostly populated with swamp banksia. Dieback has eradicated a population of the threatened granite banksia.

=== Animals ===
Two Peoples Bay is home to Australia's most threatened mammal and one of the rarest animals in the world, the Gilbert's potoroo (Potorous gilbertii). This potoroo was thought to be extinct (having not been spotted for a century) until the population at Two Peoples Bay was discovered in 1994. It was estimated in 2007 that there were fewer than 40 individuals left in the wild. There had been around 20 individuals living within the reserve in November 2015, when a huge fire swept through the reserve. The fire killed 15 of the animals and destroyed most of its habitat; it is estimated that the population would take an estimated 20 years to rejuvenate.

Other threatened mammals in the area include the southern brown bandicoot, western ringtail possum, Australian sea lion and the New Zealand fur seal. Quokkas are also known to inhabit the park and Two Peoples Bay is thought to be near the eastern limit of their range. Several reptiles can be found in the park including little brown snake, carpet python, beautiful skink and mournful skink.

==== Birds ====
The reserve forms part of the Two Peoples Bay and Mount Manypeaks Important Bird Area, identified as such by BirdLife International because of its significance in the conservation of several rare and threatened bird species. It supports a population of noisy scrub-birds, a species that was thought to be extinct until rediscovered in 1961. The population then was estimated at less than 100, while in 1994 it was thought to be around 1,100 (of which 450 occur in the reserve). Other threatened birds inhabiting the reserve are the western ground parrot, western bristlebird, western whipbird and Australasian bittern. Other threatened bird species that have been observed within the park include Carnaby's black cockatoo, peregrine falcon, hooded plover, little bittern and red-eared firetail. Seabirds nesting on the islands around the bay include the great-winged petrel and flesh-footed shearwater.

== Facilities ==
Two Peoples Bay boasts unspoilt coastal scenery and is a vital area for threatened animal species. There are beaches with path access that are suitable for fishing, swimming and snorkelling. Facilities within the reserve include a visitors centre with information and audiovisual presentations, car parking on and off the beach near the barbecue area, a boat ramp, toilets, rubbish bins at the picnic area, gas barbecues, a water tap near the barbecue area and toilets, and seating. There is no drinking water available elsewhere. There is an entry fee for the reserve.

The biggest attraction in Two Peoples Bay Nature Reserve is Little Beach, which is popular with tourists, and consistently appears in TripAdvisor's top three attractions of the Albany area. Australia's beach expert Brad Farmer named Little Beach as twelfth on his 2018 list of Australia's top 101 beaches.

== See also ==
- List of places on the State Register of Heritage Places in the City of Albany
