= Mount Manypeaks =

Mountain in Western Australia

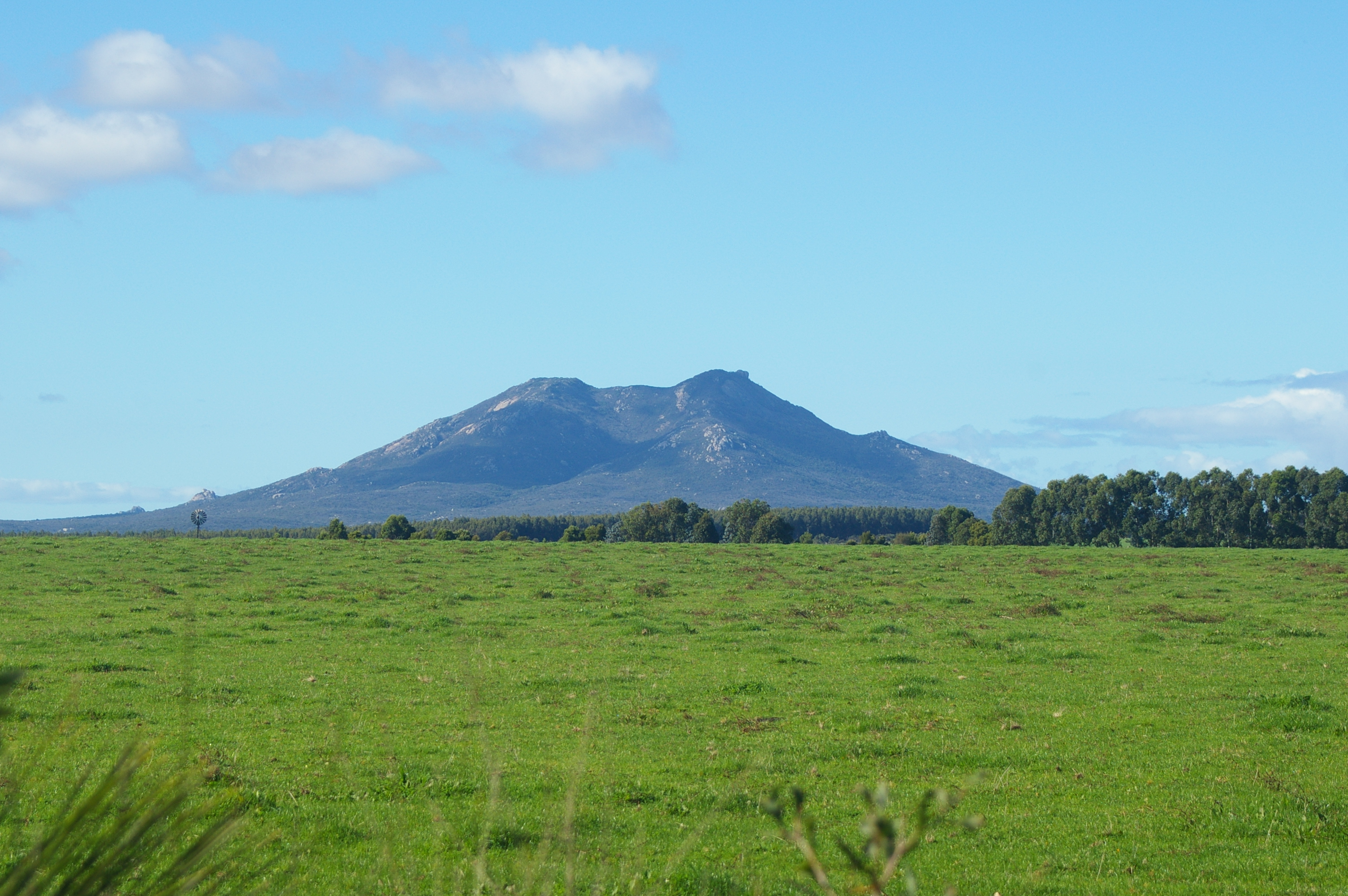
- Mount Manypeaks from South Coast Highway

Highest point
- Elevation: 565 m (1,854 ft)
- Prominence: 565 m (1,854 ft)
- Coordinates: 34°53′46″S 118°15′43″E

Geography
- Location within Western Australia
- Location: Great Southern of Western Australia

Mount Manypeaks is a distinctive peak located approximately 35 kilometres (22 mi) north-east of Albany, 10 kilometres (6 mi) north-east of Two Peoples Bay and 6 kilometres (4 mi) south-east of the town of Manypeaks, in Western Australia. Mount Manypeaks Nature Reserve lies to the south of the peak, extending along the coast.

== History ==
The mountain is the dominant feature in the area and was named by Captain Matthew Flinders in January 1802 whilst surveying the south coast region in HMS Investigator. Flinders noted in his journal: "There are a number of small peaks upon the top of this ridge, which induced me to give it the name Mount Manypeak". The plural form has now become the accepted form of spelling.

== Location and description ==
Situated around 35 kilometres (22 mi) north-east of Albany, 10 kilometres (6 mi) north-east of Two Peoples Bay and 6 kilometres (4 mi) south-east of the town of Manypeaks, the mountain lies within the City of Albany local government area.

== Geology ==
The Mount Manypeaks formation has a total length of 22 kilometres (14 mi) and has a width of 3 kilometres (2 mi). The ridge is made up primarily of a type of granite, proterozoic porphyritic biotite granite as well as adamellite. In places limestone lies over the granite block.

== Birds ==
The Mount Manypeaks Nature Reserve forms part of the Two Peoples Bay and Mount Manypeaks Important Bird Area, identified as such by BirdLife International because of its significance in the conservation of several rare and threatened bird species.

== Nature reserve ==
Mount Manypeaks Nature Reserve stretches along the coast to the south of the mountain peak.

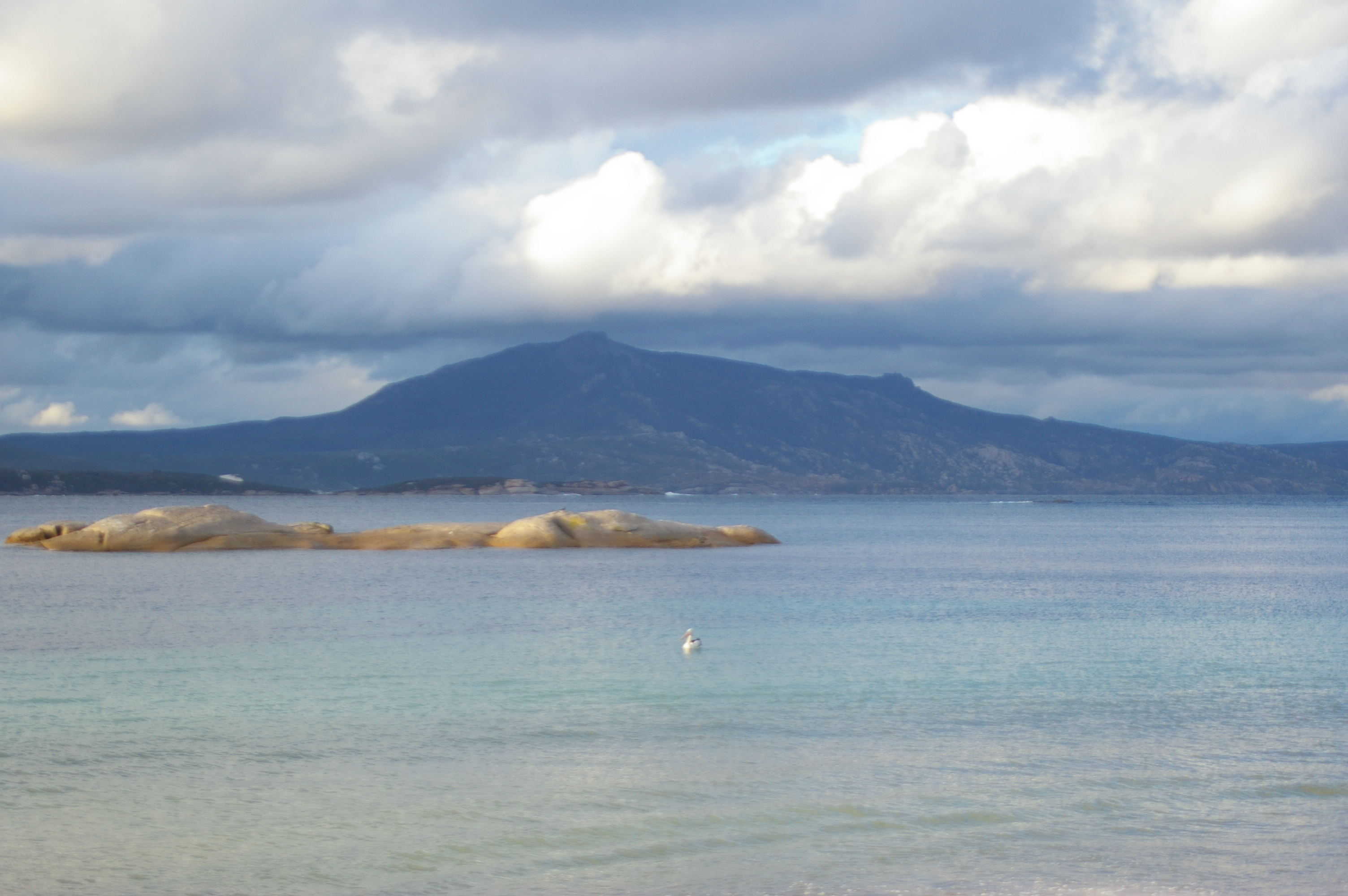
Mount Manypeaks from Two Peoples Bay

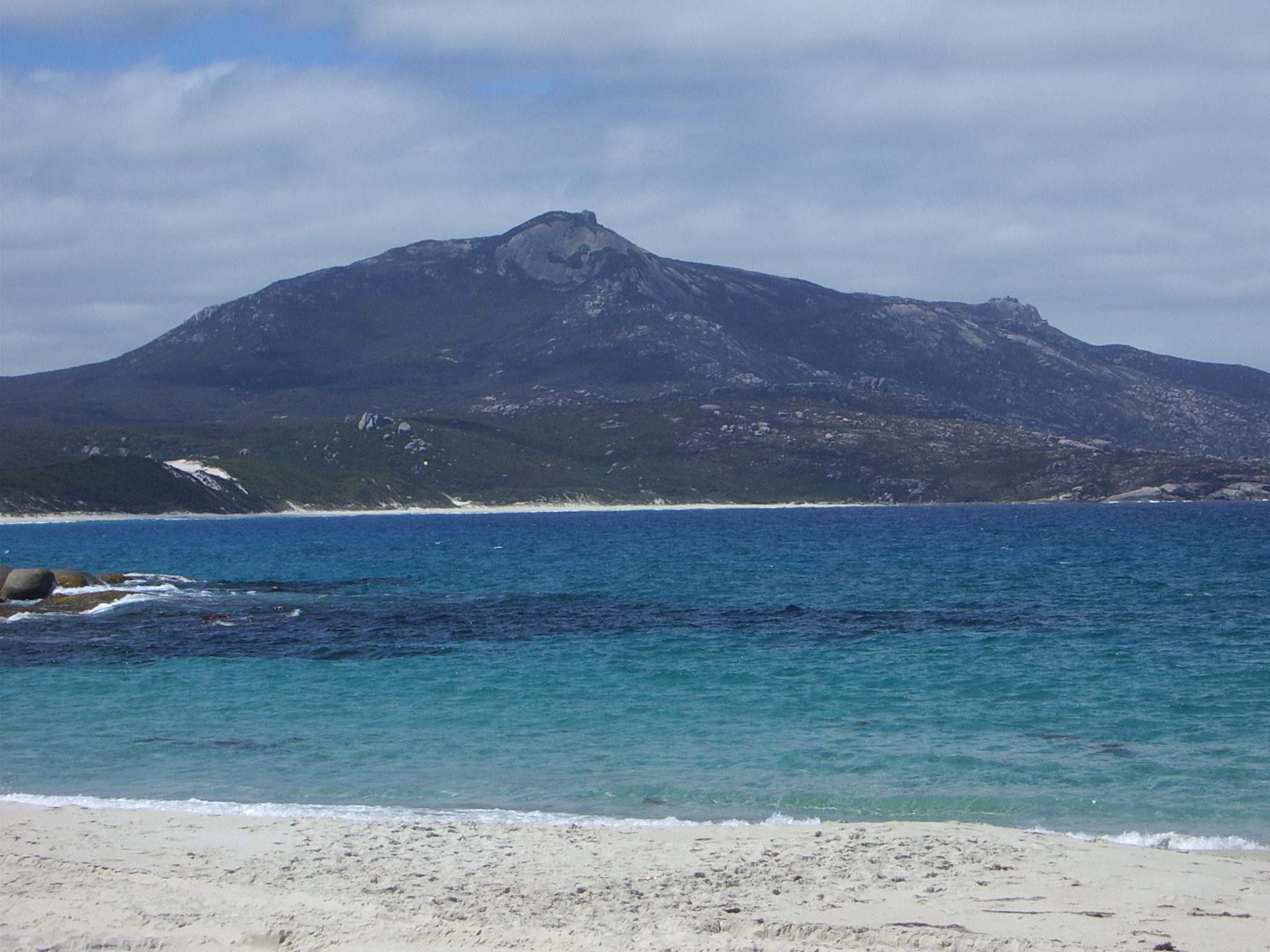
Mount Manypeaks from Bettys Beach
