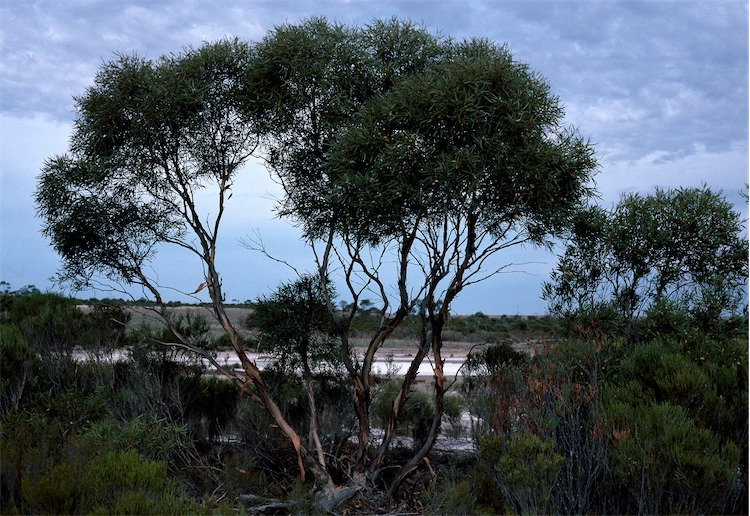
- Eucalyptus halophila near Esperance

Conservation status
- Vulnerable (IUCN 3.1)

Scientific classification
- Kingdom: Plantae
- Clade: Tracheophytes
- Clade: Angiosperms
- Clade: Eudicots
- Clade: Rosids
- Order: Myrtales
- Family: Myrtaceae
- Genus: Eucalyptus
- Species: E. halophila

Binomial name
- Eucalyptus halophila D.J.Carr & S.G.M.Carr

= Eucalyptus halophila =

Salt lake mallee

Species of eucalyptus

Eucalyptus halophila, also known as salt lake mallee, is a species of mallee or a shrub, that is endemic to Western Australia. It has smooth white and grey bark, sometimes rough and fibrous on the lower trunk, linear to narrow elliptic adult leaves, flower buds usually in grows of seven, white flowers and shortened spherical to barrel-shaped fruit.

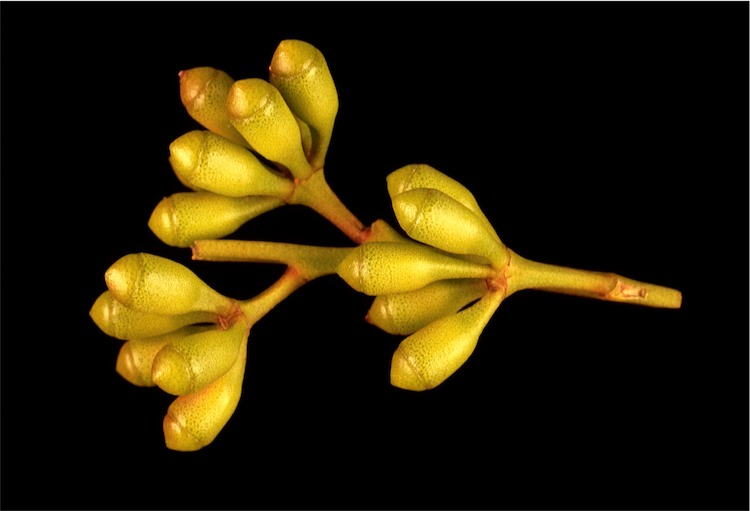
Flower buds

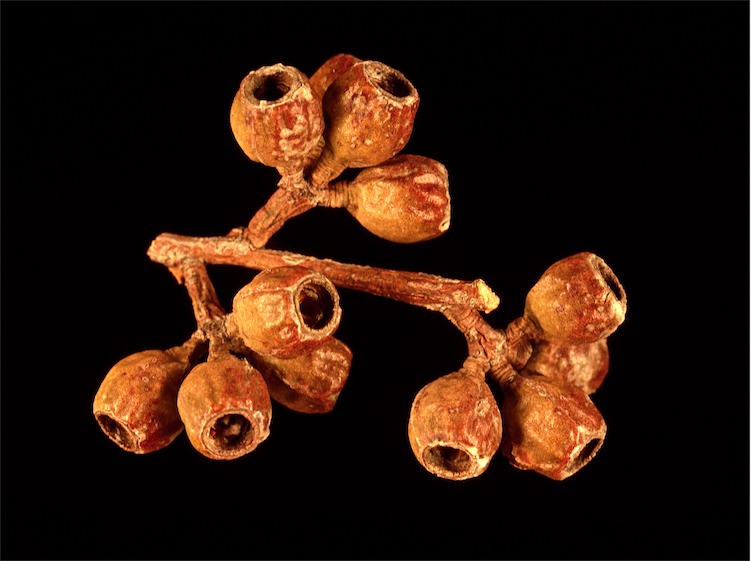
Fruit

== Description ==
Eucalyptus halophila is a shrub or mallee that typically grows to a height of 1 to 4 metres (3 to 13 ft), sometime to 7 m (23 ft), or a shrub up to 2 m (6 ft 7 in) tall, and forms a lignotuber. It has smooth white and pale grey bark, sometimes with fibrous bark on the lower half of its stems. Young plants and coppice regrowth have leaves that are linear, 40–85 mm (1.6–3.3 in) long and 3–6 mm (0.12–0.24 in) wide. Adult leaves are linear to narrow elliptic, the same dull green colour on both sides, 50–80 mm (2.0–3.1 in) long and 5–12 mm (0.20–0.47 in) wide on a petiole 3–9 mm (0.12–0.35 in) long. The flower buds are arranged in leaf axils in groups of seven, sometimes three, on an unbranched peduncle 5–13 mm (0.20–0.51 in) long, the individual buds on pedicels 2–3 mm (0.079–0.118 in) long. Mature buds are pear-shaped, 4–5 mm (0.16–0.20 in) long and 3–5 mm (0.12–0.20 in) wide with a conical to rounded operculum. Flowering occurs from January to May and the flowers are creamy white. The fruit is a woody, shortened spherical or barrel-shaped fruit that is 5–9 mm (0.20–0.35 in) long and 5–8 mm (0.20–0.31 in) wide with the valves enclosed below rim level.

== Taxonomy and naming ==
Eucalyptus halophila was first formally described in 1980 by Denis and Maisie Carr from a specimen Maisie collected with Alex George near a small salt pan near Dalyup. The description was published in the journal Nuytsia. The specific epithet (halophila) is derived from the ancient Greek halo meaning 'salt' and -philus meaning 'loving', referring to the habitat of this species.

== Distribution and habitat ==
Salt lake mallee grows in sandy clay soils on flat areas in shrubland adjacent to salt lakes. It is only known from the catchment of the Dalyup River between Dalyup and Mount Ney near Esperance in the Esperance Plains and Mallee biogeographic regions.

== Conservation status ==
Eucalyptus halophila is classified as "not threatened" by the Western Australian Government Department of Parks and Wildlife. The IUCN Red List assesses the species as Vulnerable.

== Use in horticulture ==
The plant is available commercially in seed form or as tubestock and is grown as an ornamental or low shelter plant. It is tolerant of frost, salt and drought and has a moderately fast growth rate.

== See also ==
- List of Eucalyptus species
