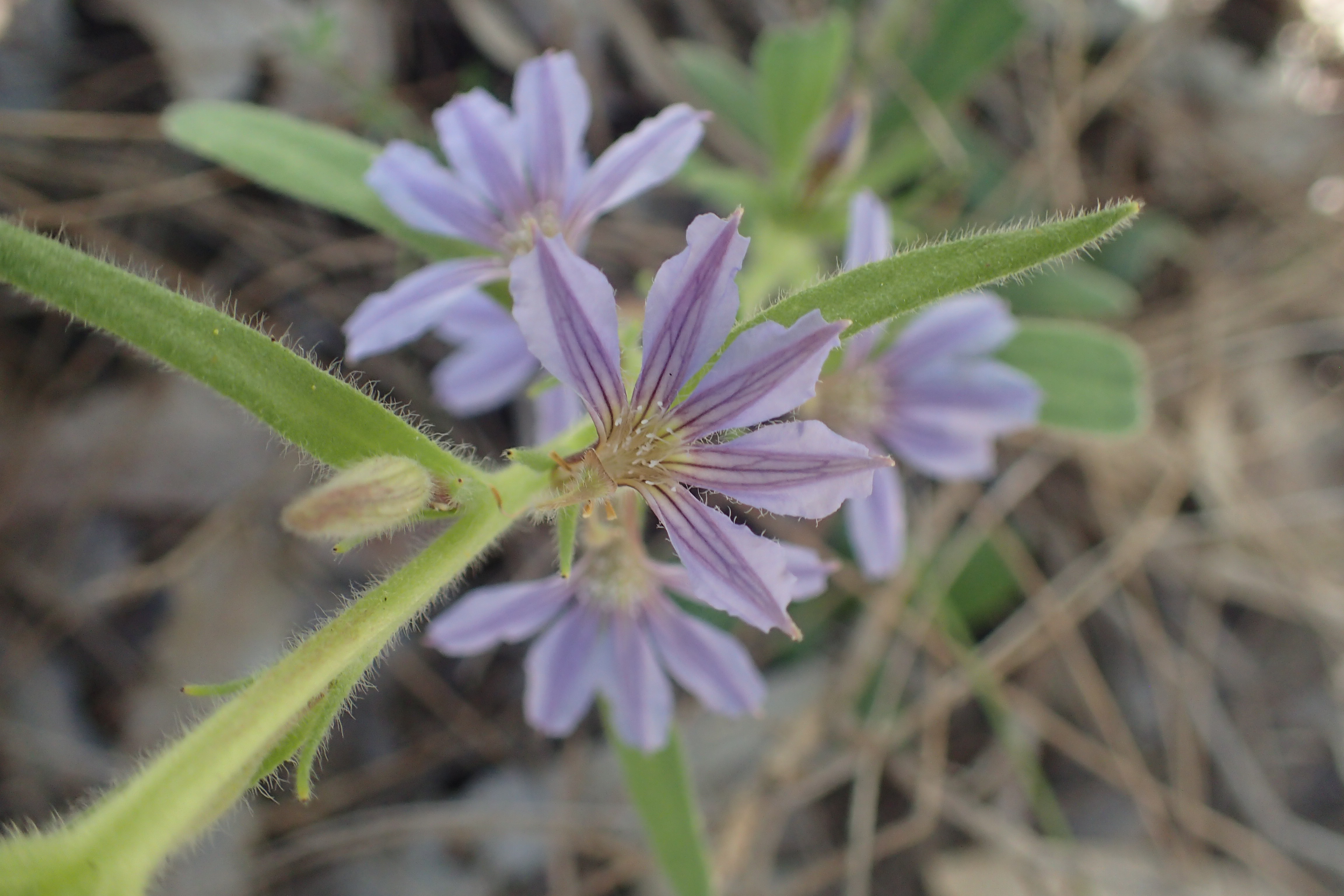
- Scaevola anchusifolia in Kings Park

Scientific classification
- Kingdom: Plantae
- Clade: Tracheophytes
- Clade: Angiosperms
- Clade: Eudicots
- Clade: Asterids
- Order: Asterales
- Family: Goodeniaceae
- Genus: Scaevola
- Species: S. anchusifolia

Binomial name
- Scaevola anchusifolia Benth.

= Scaevola anchusifolia =

Silky scaevola

Species of flowering plant

Scaevola anchusifolia commonly known as silky scaevola, is a species of flowering plant in the family Goodeniaceae. It is a small, upright or decumbent shrub with fan-shaped blue to bluish white flowers and is endemic to Western Australia.

== Description ==
Scaevola anchusifolia is a decumbent or upright shrub to 1.4 m (4 ft 7 in) high and stems with rough, longish hairs. The leaves are oblong-lance shaped, taper toward the base, margins smooth or toothed, 9 cm (3.5 in) long and up to 1.8 cm (0.71 in) wide. The flowers are borne on terminal spikes up to 15 cm (5.9 in) long. The bracts are narrowly elliptic to linear shaped, 8–76 mm (0.31–2.99 in) long and gradually taper to a point. The corolla is 10–22 mm (0.39–0.87 in) long, light blue to bluish white, hairy on the outside, bearded inside and the wings about 1 mm (0.039 in) wide. Flowering occurs from July to November and the fruit is a rounded, flattened shape, wrinkled, smooth and with two sterile cavities.

== Taxonomy ==
Scaevola anchusifolia was first formally described in 1837 by George Bentham and the description was published in Enumeratio plantarum quas in Novae Hollandiae ora austro-occidentali ad fluvium Cygnorum et in Sinu Regis Georgii collegit Carolus liber baro de Hügel.

== Distribution and habitat ==
Silky scaevola grows from the Murchison River to Yalgorup National Park on coastal plains, limestone ridges and sand dunes.
