= Pterostylis frenchii =

Tuart rufous greenhood

Conservation status
- Priority Two — Poorly Known Taxa (DEC)

Scientific classification
- Kingdom: Plantae
- Clade: Tracheophytes
- Clade: Angiosperms
- Clade: Monocots
- Order: Asparagales
- Family: Orchidaceae
- Subfamily: Orchidoideae
- Tribe: Cranichideae
- Genus: Pterostylis
- Species: P. frenchii

Binomial name
- Pterostylis frenchii M.A.Clem. & D.L.Jones

Synonyms
- Oligochaetochilus frenchii (M.A.Clem. & D.L.Jones) Szlach.

Species of orchid

Pterostylis frenchii, commonly known as the tuart rufous greenhood, or tuart rustyhood is a plant in the orchid family Orchidaceae and is endemic to the south-west of Western Australia. Both flowering and non-flowering plants have a relatively large rosette of leaves. Flowering plants also have up to twelve white and green or white and brown flowers which lean forward and have a small, fleshy, insect-like labellum.

== Description ==
Pterostylis frenchii is a terrestrial, perennial, deciduous, herb with an underground tuber and a rosette of between four and twelve leaves. The leaves are 15–35 mm (0.6–1 in) long and 12–25 mm (0.5–1 in) wide. Flowering plants have a rosette at the base of the flowering stem but the leaves are usually withered by flowering time. Between two and twelve or more translucent white and green or brown flowers which lean forward, 23–28 mm (0.9–1 in) long and 5–8 mm (0.2–0.3 in) wide are borne on a flowering spike 150–400 mm (6–20 in) tall. The dorsal sepal and petals form a hood or "galea" over the column with the dorsal sepal having a narrow tip about 7 mm (0.3 in) long. The lateral sepals turn downwards, are glabrous, about the same width as the galea and suddenly taper to narrow tips 12–15 mm (0.5–0.6 in) long which turn forward and are roughly parallel to each other. The labellum is fleshy, dark brown and insect-like, about 4 mm (0.16 in) long, 2 mm (0.08 in) wide and covered with long and short hairs. Flowering occurs from November to December.

== Taxonomy and naming ==
The tuart rufous greenhood was first formally described in 2004 by David Jones and given the name Oligochaetochilus frenchii. The type specimen was collected in Yalgorup National Park by Chris French and the description was published in The Orchadian. In 2007 Andrew Brown changed the name to Pterostylis frenchii. The specific epithet (frenchii) honours the collector of the type specimen.

== Distribution and habitat ==
This greenhood grows in sandy woodland and shrubland near the coast between Bunbury and Perth in the Swan Coastal Plain biogeographic region.

== Conservation ==
Pterostylis frenchii is classified as "Priority Two" by the Western Australian Government Department of Parks and Wildlife, meaning that it is poorly known and known from only one or a few locations.
