= Lake Gore =

- Location in Western Australia
- Interactive map of Lake Gore
- Location: Goldfields-Esperance, Western Australia
- Coordinates: 33°46′31″S 121°31′24″E
- Type: Seasonal freshwater
- Primary inflows: Dalyup River
- Basin countries: Australia
- Designation: Lake Gore Nature Reserve; Lake Gore Ramsar Site
- Max. length: 2.5 km (2 mi)
- Max. width: 2.5 km (2 mi)
- Surface area: 740 ha (1,829 acres)
- Average depth: 1.4 m (5 ft)
- Max. depth: 2 m (7 ft)
- Water volume: 10 m (33 ft)

Ramsar Wetland
- Designated: 5 January 2001
- Reference no.: 1049

Lake Gore is a seasonal and semi-permanent saline lake in the Goldfields-Esperance region of Western Australia, approximately 24 km (15 mi) west of Esperance. It is an important site for waterbirds.

== Description ==
The lake is almost circular in shape and has several smaller lakes located to the west, including Lake Kubitch and Carbul Lake. A smaller lake, Quallilup Lake, lies further to the south near Shelley Beach. The lake and its surrounds are situated in the Albany-Fraser Orogen with alluvial sediments overlying gneiss, sandstone and limestone on a sub-coastal plain. The lake itself is a sub-terminal drainage basin. The wetland area has a total volume of 30 km^{3} (7 mi^{3}) and a total catchment area of 1,140,000 km^{2} (440,156 sq mi).

=== Hydrology ===
The lake is recharged mostly via surface flow from the Dalyup River directly into Lake Gore with Coobidge Creek supplying many of the surrounding lake systems. The maximum depth of Lake Gore is recorded as 2.02 m (7 ft) in 1986 when the lake was inundated but with a mean depth of 1.43 m (5 ft) and the lake has dried up several times the last being in 1984.

The water is colourless and has low tannin levels. The salinity of the river varies depending on rainfall, the minimum salinity is recorded as 6.5ppt but the September mean is 52ppt. Salinity levels rise as the lake dries out in summer. The pH of the lake water fluctuates between 7.1 and 9.4. The water quality and salinity levels are regularly monitored by local school students as part of the Ribbons of Blue program.

=== Flora and fauna ===
The wetlands support a narrow zone of woodland composed of saltwater paperbark, with an understorey of sedges such as coastal saw-sedge and Schoenus brevifolius. The area is a suitable habitat for a variety of birds, with over 20,000 visiting the lake each year. It supports the largest known population of hooded plover, holding up to one third of the global population. It is important as a moulting site for Australian shelduck, and as a drought refuge for large numbers of ducks and shorebirds. It also supports up to 10% of the global population of banded stilt. The Lake Gore system has been identified by BirdLife International as an Important Bird Area (IBA) because it supports over 1% of the world population of hooded plovers and has also supported over 1% of the world populations of Australian shelducks and banded stilts.

== Protection ==
Lake Gore is part of Nature Reserve 32419, set aside for conservation purposes. The Dalyup River flows into the eastern end of the lake. The wetlands of which the lake is a part cover an area of 4,017 hectares (9,926 acres) and were recognised as being of international importance through designation under the Ramsar Convention on 5 January 2001 as Ramsar Site 1049. The lake is also a DIWA-listed wetland.

== See also ==
- List of lakes of Australia § Western Australia
