= Yalgorup Important Bird Area =

Important Bird Area in Western Australia

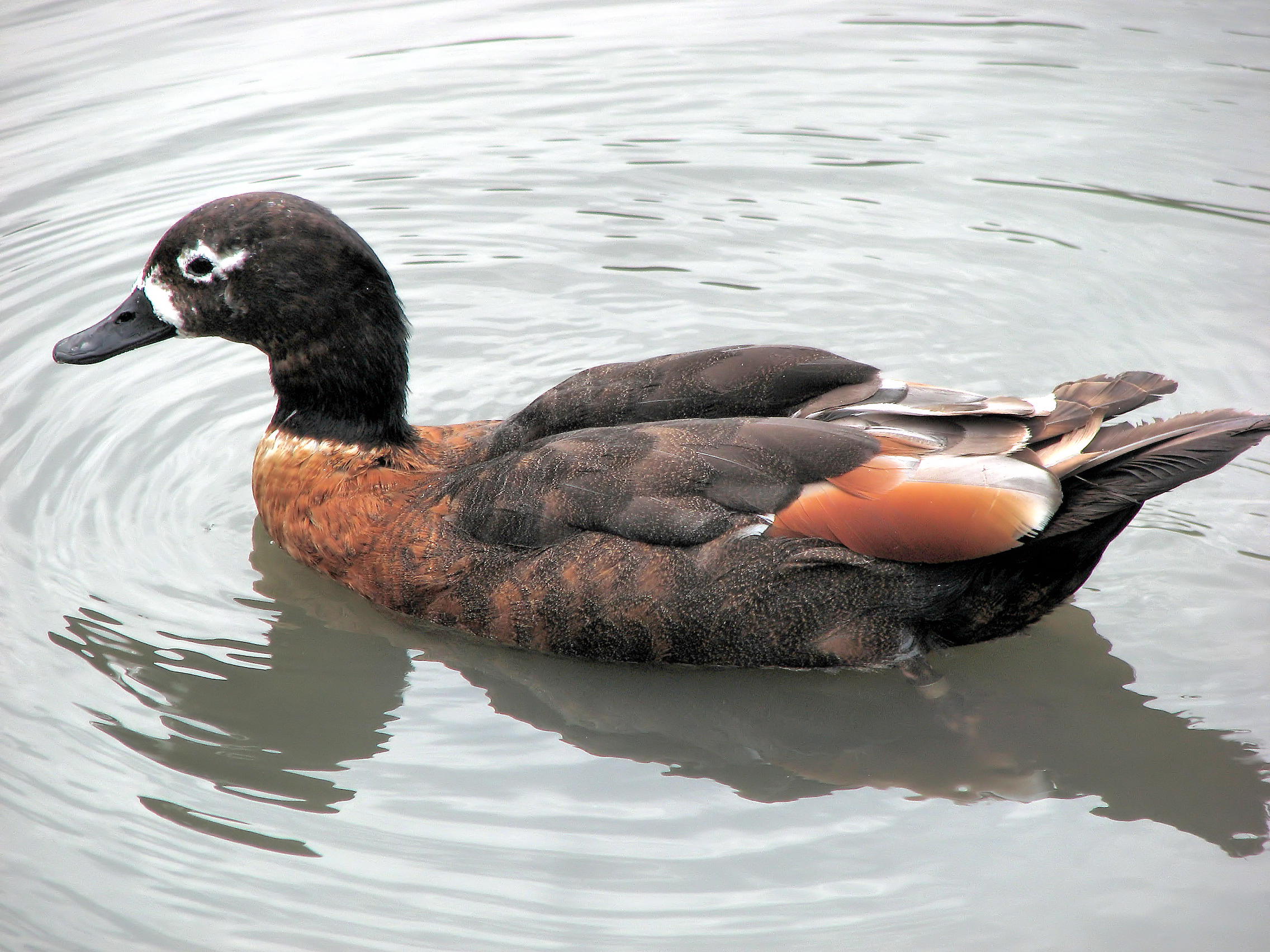
- The IBA is an important site for Australian shelducks
- Interactive map of Yalgorup Important Bird Area
- Location: Swan Coastal Plain, Western Australia
- Coordinates: 32°54′45″S 115°41′03″E

The Yalgorup Important Bird Area comprises a group of parallel, linear wetlands, with a collective area of 59 km^{2}, on the Swan Coastal Plain of south-west Western Australia between the cities of Mandurah and Bunbury. It is an important site for waterbirds.

== Description ==
The site encompasses the wetlands of the Yalgorup National Park; it lies just to the south of the Peel-Harvey IBA but is apparently used by waterbirds as a distinct wetland system. The major wetlands of the site are Lakes Clifton, Preston, Pollard, Yalgorup, Boundary, martins Tank, Hayward and Newnham. The lakes are evaporative salt lakes mainly fed by fresh groundwater and precipitation and vary up to about 4 m in depth. Median annual rainfall in the area is about 880 mm, falling mainly from May to August. Some of the lakes have a fringe by samphire, rushes and sedges, beyond which is a zone of paperbarks, with saltwater paperbark and red-eyed wattle around the hypersaline lakes. Many of the shorelines have been cleared for agriculture. The IBA is part of the Peel-Yalgorup Ramsar site.

== Birds ==
The site has been identified as an Important Bird Area (IBA) by BirdLife International because it supports fairy terns, large numbers of hooded plovers and over 1% of the world populations of Australian shelducks, red-necked stints, banded stilts and, sometimes, musk ducks. Other birds recorded on the lakes in relatively large numbers include red-capped plovers, red-necked avocets, Pacific black ducks, little black cormorants, great crested grebes and black swans.
