= Birchs Inlet =

Inlet of Macquarie Harbour, Tasmania

- Birch's Inlet; Birches Inlet
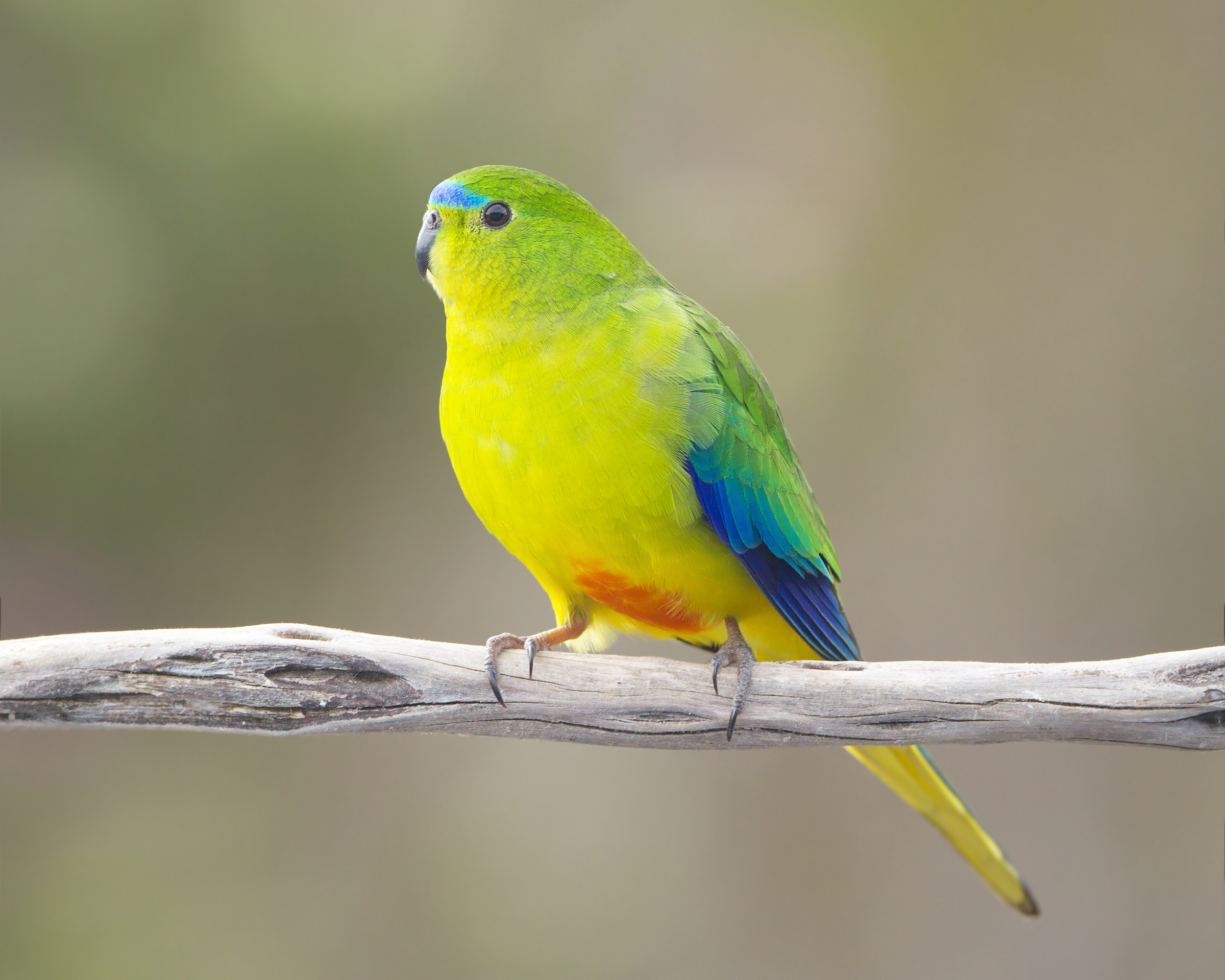
- The area is important for orange-bellied parrots.

- Location on the western coast of Tasmania

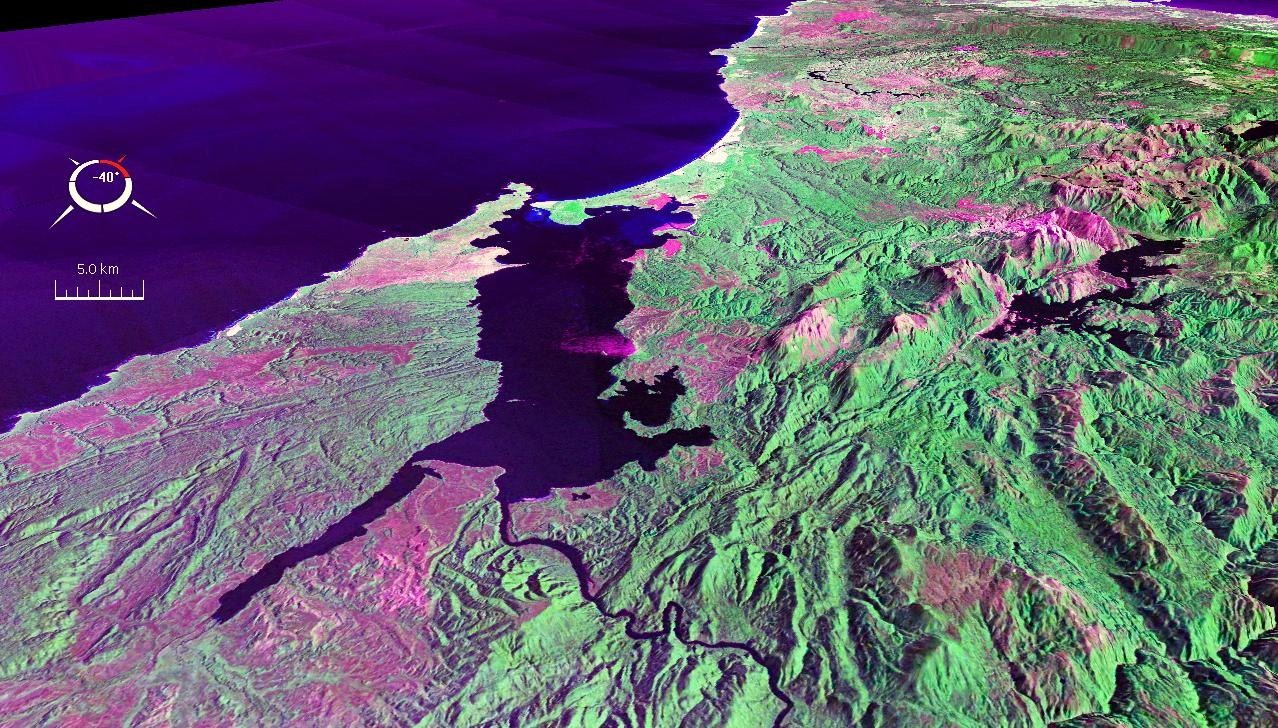
- False colour Landsat image of Macquarie Harbour, facing north-west, showing Birchs Inlet extending to the lower left and the Gordon River at the bottom.
- Location: West Coast Tasmania
- Coordinates: 42°30′46″S 145°28′12″E
- Etymology: Thomas William Birch
- Primary inflows: Macquarie Harbour
- River sources: Birchs River; Pocacker River; Sorell River
- Ocean/sea sources: Southern Ocean
- Basin countries: Australia
- Max. length: 15 kilometres (9.3 mi)

The Birchs Inlet, also spelt Birch's Inlet or Birches Inlet, is a narrow cove or coastal inlet on the south-western side of Macquarie Harbour on the west coast of Tasmania, Australia. The inlet is located within the Southwest National Park, part of the Tasmanian Wilderness World Heritage Area.

== Features and location ==
The inlet lies approximately 38 kilometres (24 mi) south of the town of Strahan and serves as the mouth of the Birchs, Pocacker and Sorell Rivers, three of several draining south-western Tasmania. About 15 kilometres (9.3 mi) in length, the mouth of the inlet lies near the head of Macquarie Harbour not far from the mouth of the Gordon River. It is only accessible by water transport. It has been at times an important access point for loggers working in the area for moving Huon pine to Strahan.

It lies at the northern end of the Melaleuca to Birchs Inlet Important Bird Area. It is one of only two (the other being at Melaleuca) study sites for orange-bellied parrots in their breeding range.

== Etymology ==
It is named after Thomas William Birch (1774-1821), a surgeon, whaler, merchant and shipowner who settled in Tasmania in 1808.
