= Melaleuca to Birchs Inlet Important Bird Area =

Important bird area in Tasmania, Australia

Coordinates: 43°08′34″S 145°54′51″E

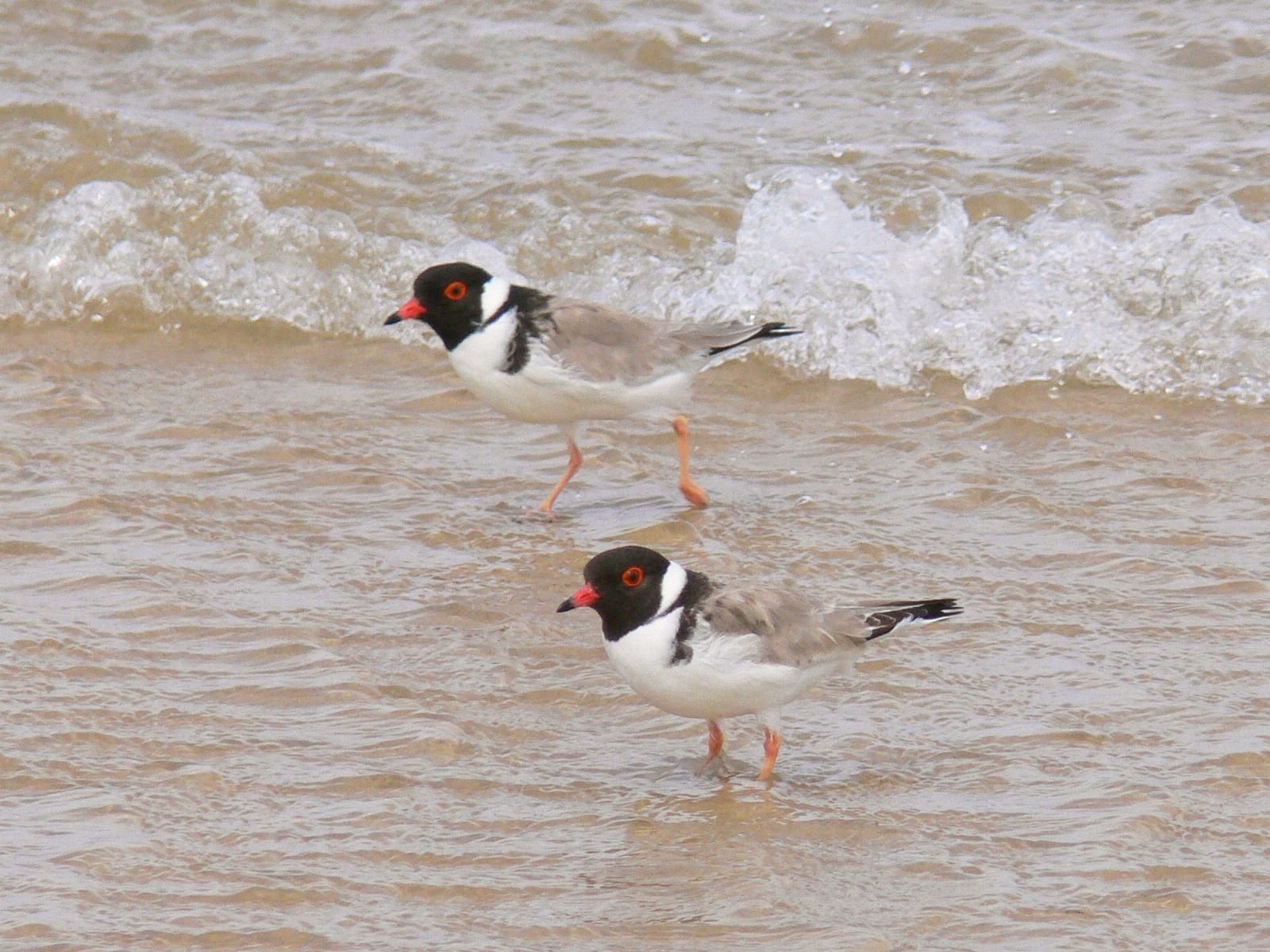
The IBA is an important area for hooded plovers.

The Melaleuca to Birchs Inlet Important Bird Area comprises a 2315 km^{2} section of coast and sub-coastal land in South West Tasmania. It stretches southward from the southern end of Birchs Inlet (where it adjoins the North-west Tasmanian Coast Important Bird Area).It encompasses Melaleuca and Port Davey, and extends to Louisa Bay on the coast facing the Maatsuyker Island group. The area is rugged, with extensive beaches and coastal plains rising to rocky mountains. It contains a mosaic of temperate rainforest, eucalypt forest, moorland and buttongrass plains.

== Birds ==
It has been identified by BirdLife International as an Important Bird Area (IBA) because it supports the entire breeding population of the critically endangered orange-bellied parrot. It also supports over 1% of the world populations of pied and sooty oystercatchers, and hooded plovers, as well as populations of most of Tasmania's endemic bird species. The buttongrass plains support eastern ground parrots.

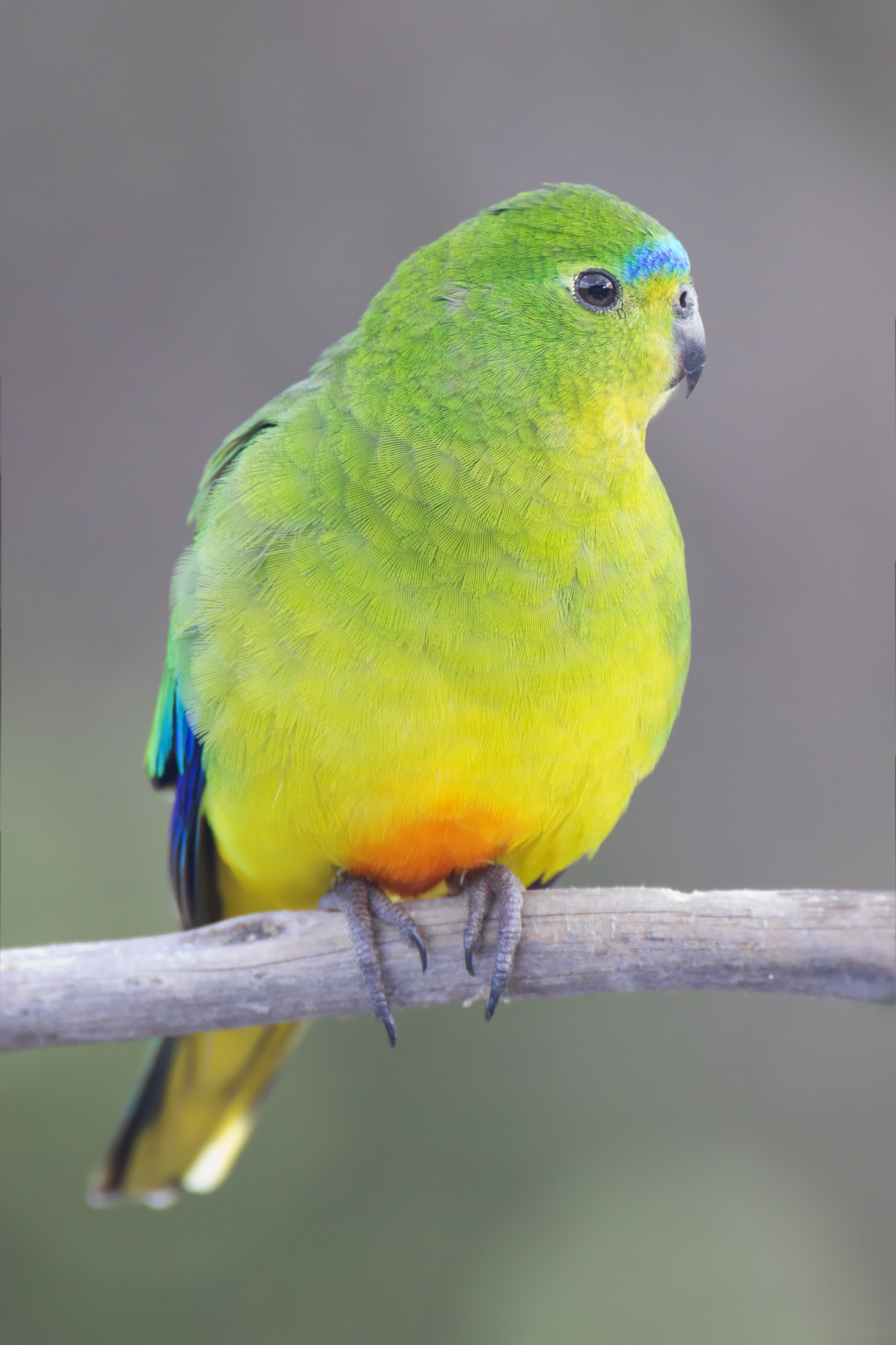
Orange-bellied parrot
