= North-west Tasmanian Coast Important Bird Area =

Important bird area in Tasmania, Australia

Coordinates: 41°51′38″S 145°09′16″E

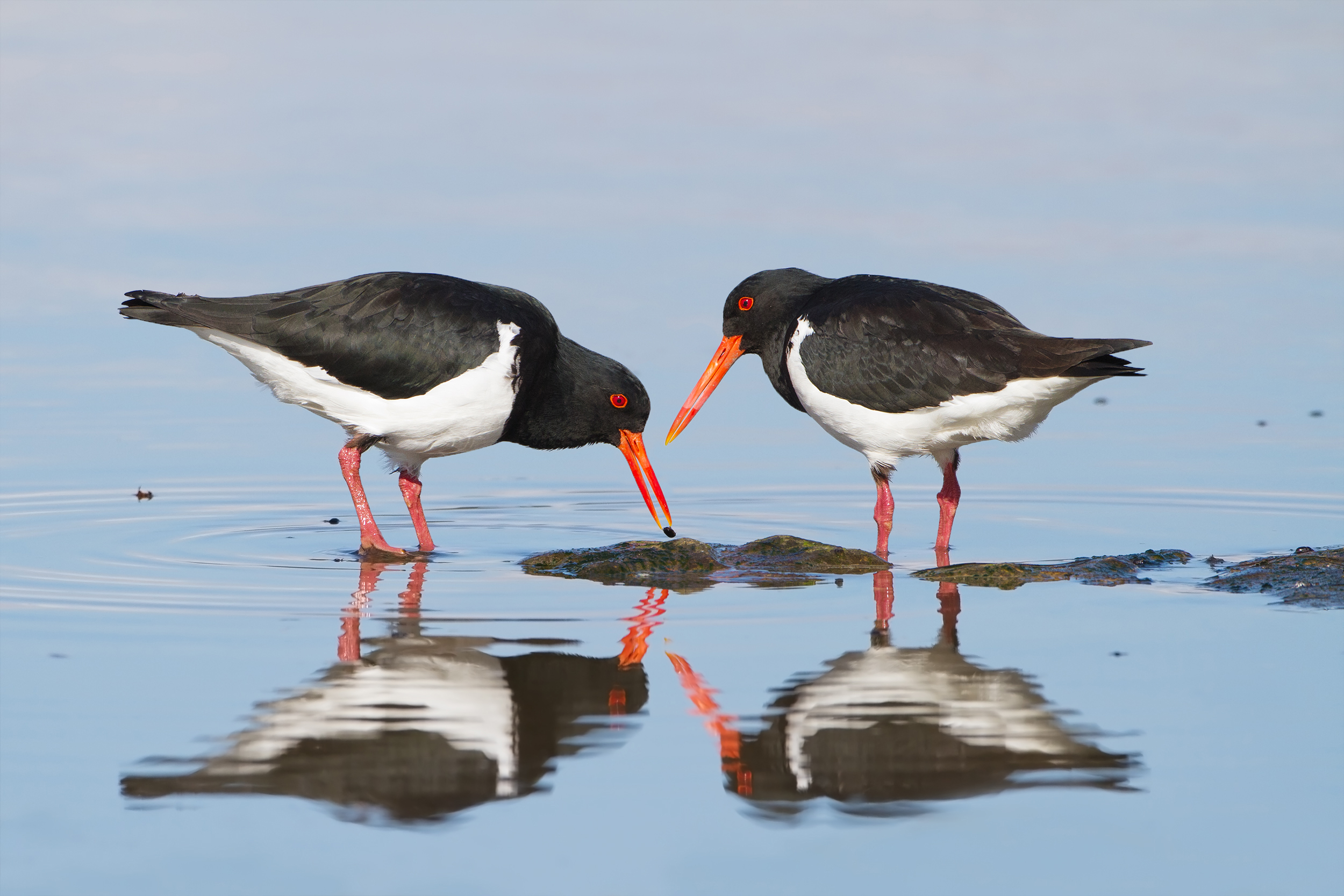
The IBA is an important area for pied oystercatchers.

The North-west Tasmanian Coast Important Bird Area comprises a 2438 km^{2} stretch of coastal and subcoastal land covering the northern section of the coast of western Tasmania, south-eastern Australia.

== Description ==
The Important Bird Area (IBA) is defined as the 10 km-wide coastal fringe extending along the western coast of Tasmania from Low Rocky Point in the south to Rocky Cape in the north, constituting the mainland Tasmanian section of migratory habitat used by orange-bellied parrots. In the south it adjoins the complementary Melaleuca to Birchs Inlet IBA which covers the south-west Tasmanian coast, with the two IBAs meeting at Macquarie Harbour. In the north it abuts the Robbins Passage and Boullanger Bay IBA.

The coast is characterised by rocky headlands, sandy beaches and sand dunes, and is backed by a coastal plain containing lagoons, swamps, heathland, eucalypt forests and woodlands, and areas of buttongrass. The climate is wet temperate maritime with an average annual rainfall of about 1000 mm on the coast, increasing with altitude to about 2000 mm in the highlands.

== Birds ==
The site has been identified by BirdLife International as an IBA because it regularly supports critically endangered orange-bellied parrots on their annual migration between the breeding ground in South West Tasmania and the wintering sites in coastal mainland south-eastern Australia. It also provides non-breeding habitat for swift parrots and supports populations of fairy terns, hooded plovers, Cape Barren geese and pied oystercatchers, as well as most of Tasmania's endemic bird species. Other birds recorded from the site include sooty oystercatchers, eastern ground parrots, flame and pink robins, tawny-crowned honeyeaters and southern emu-wrens.
