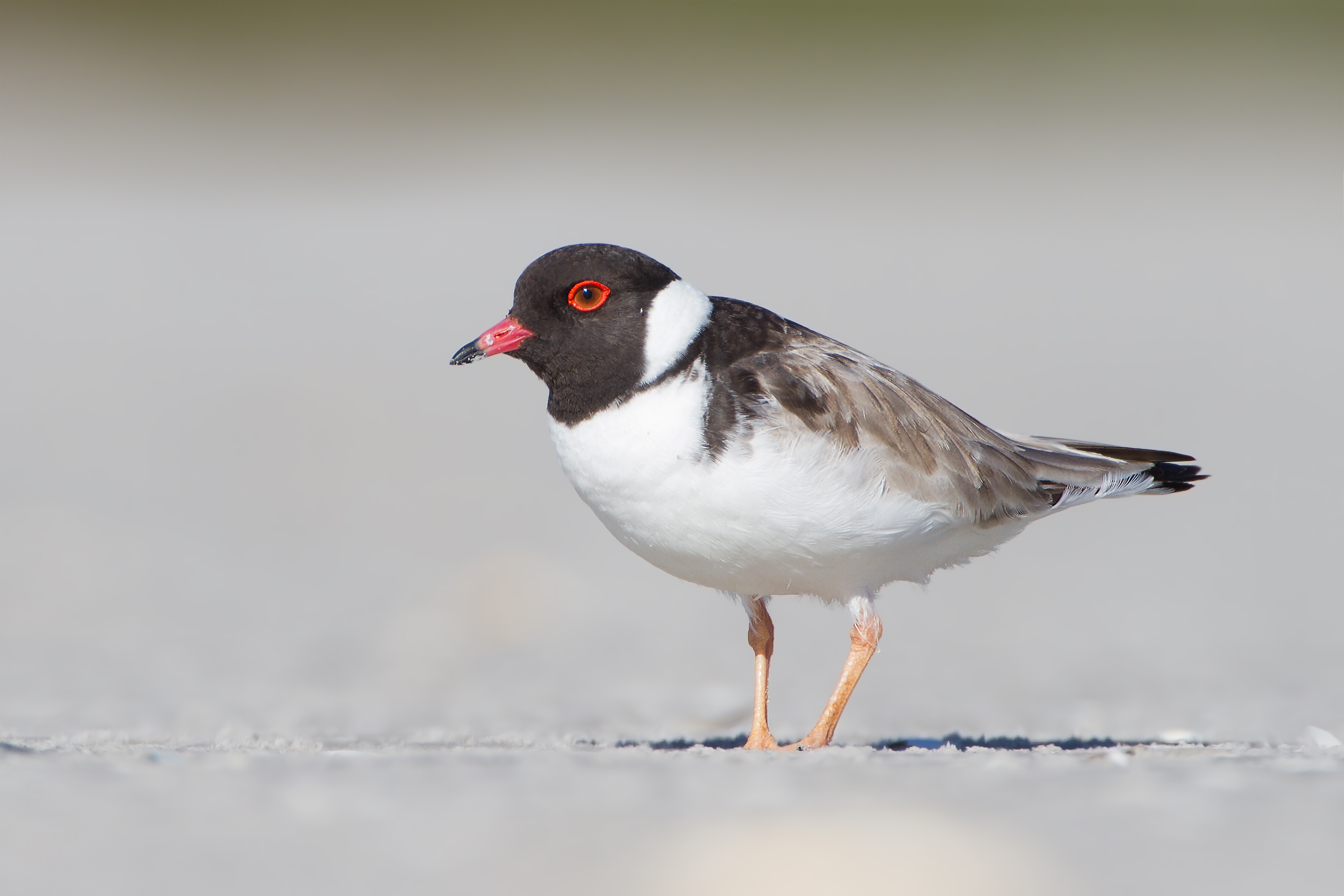
- At Prosser River Spit, Orford, Tasmania, Australia

Conservation status
- Near Threatened (IUCN 3.1)

Scientific classification
- Kingdom: Animalia
- Phylum: Chordata
- Class: Aves
- Order: Charadriiformes
- Family: Charadriidae
- Genus: Thinornis
- Species: T. cucullatus

Binomial name
- Thinornis cucullatus (Vieillot, 1818)
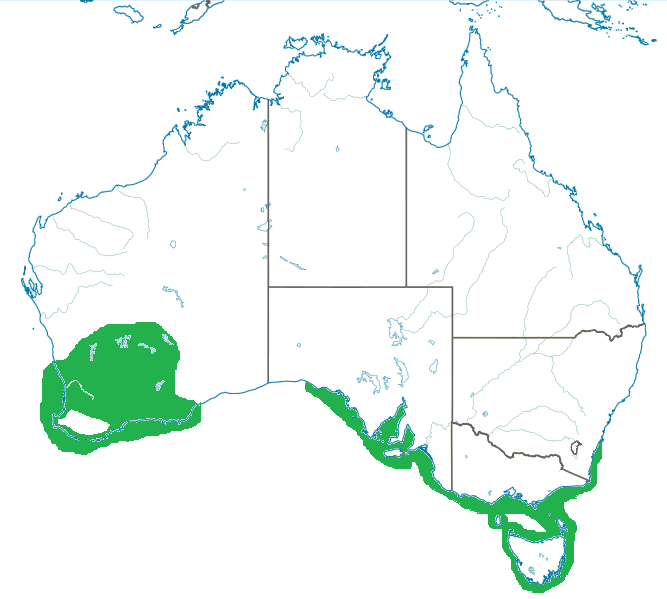
- Range

Synonyms
- Charadrius rubricollis Gmelin, 1789; Charadrius cucullatus

= Hooded plover =

Species of bird

The hooded plover or hooded dotterel (Thinornis cucullatus) is a species of bird in the family Charadriidae. It is endemic to southern Australia, where it inhabits ocean beaches and subcoastal lagoons.

== Taxonomy ==
The hooded plover was formally described in 1818 by the French ornithologist Louis Pierre Vieillot under the current binomial name Charadrius cucullatus. The binomial name Charadrius cucullatus was at one time treated as a junior synonym of Charadrius rubricollis Gmelin, 1789, but in 1998 the American ornithologist Storrs L. Olson designated a lectotype for C. rubricollis and made it a junior synonym of Tringa lobata Linnaeus, 1758, now the red-necked phalarope Phalaropus lobatus. In the early 2000s the hooded plover was moved from the original genus Charadrius to the genus Thinornis, along with the shore plover. A molecular phylogenetic study published in 2015 found Thinornis was sister to the genus Charadrius. This was confirmed by another study published in 2022. The species is monotypic: no subspecies are recognised.

== Description ==
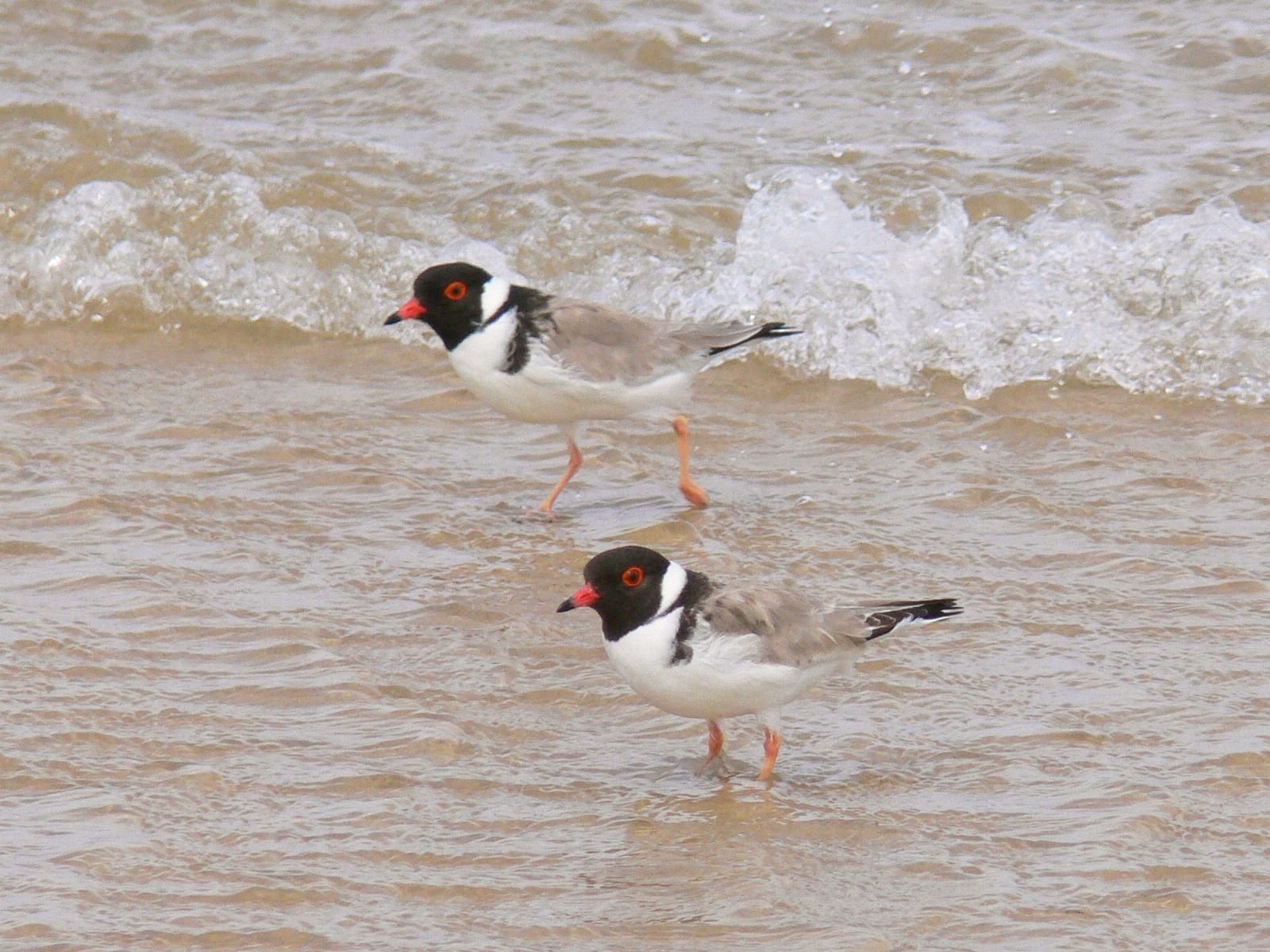
A breeding pair

The hooded plover is medium in size for a plover, stocky, and pale in colour. Its length is 190 to 230 mm (7.5–9.1 in) and its wing-span 230 to 440 mm (9.1–17.3 in). It has a black hood and throat with a white collar. Its red bill has a black tip. It has a red eye ring and orange legs. Underparts are white. Males and females are similar. Adults and juveniles are similar except the juveniles do not have the black head and hindneck, which are instead a sandy brown.

== Distribution and habitat ==
Its natural habitats are freshwater lakes, freshwater marshes, coastal saline lagoons, and sandy beaches. Heavy populations are found on beaches with seaweed and dunes. It is threatened by habitat loss because of its small population and limited native range. It is a non-migratory inhabitant of coastal and subcoastal Western Australia, South Australia, New South Wales, Victoria and Tasmania, and is a vagrant in Queensland.

== Behaviour ==
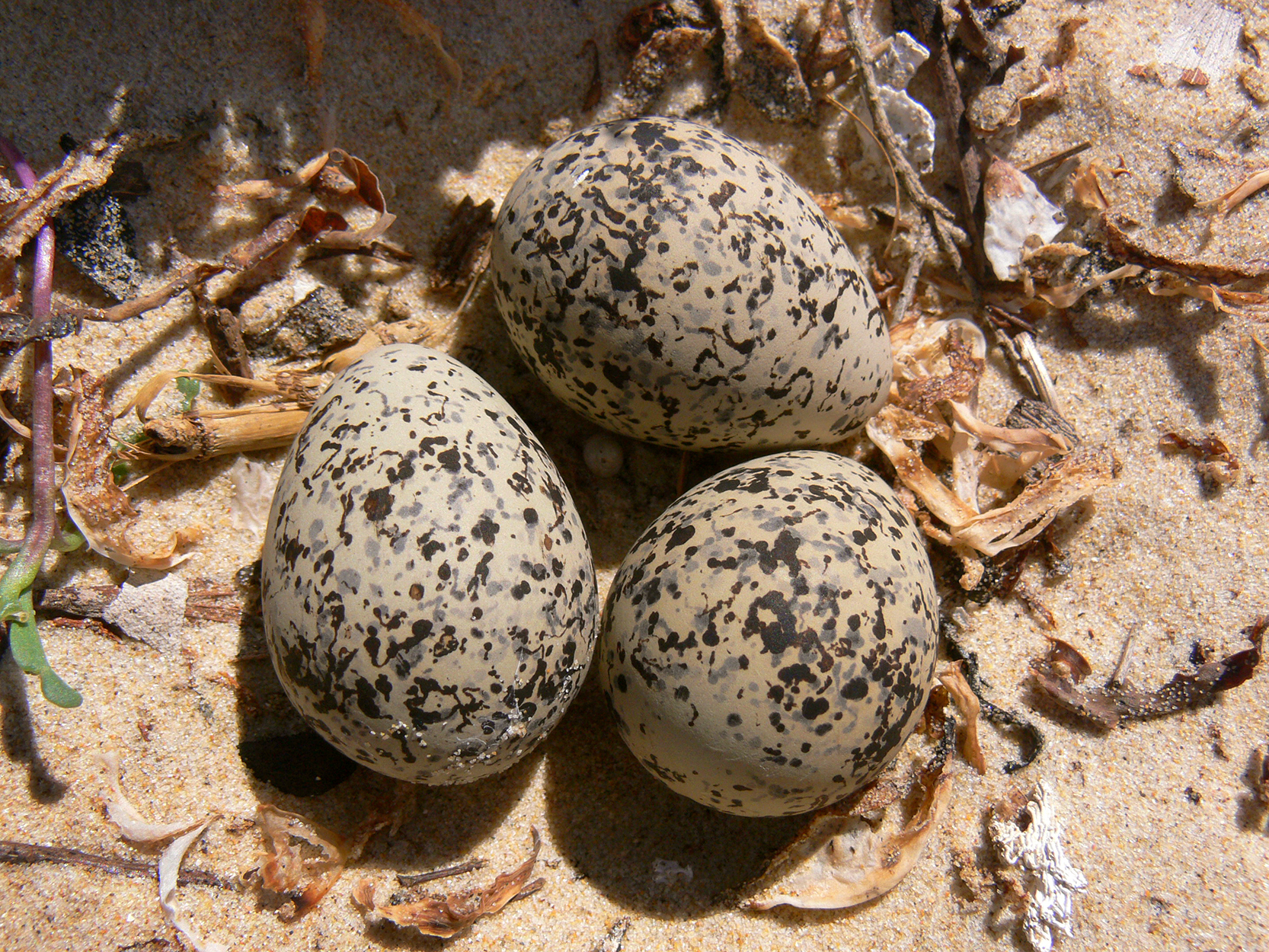
Eggs

=== Breeding ===
A clutch of 1–3 eggs is laid from August to March, which includes also the peak of the Austral summer tourist season in its range and it is thereby heavily impacted by human activities. The eggs are a matte beige or cream colour heavily sprinkled with dark brown and lavender markings, especially at the larger end of the egg. Pyriform in shape, they measure 37 mm × 27 mm (1.46 in × 1.06 in). Eggs hatch in about 30 days.

=== Food and feeding ===
The eastern population eats a variety of invertebrates but little is known of the diet of the western population. Specifically it eats insects, bivalves, and sandhoppers. It is usually seen in pairs or small groups near the water. For breeding it will dig a shallow scrape in sand or gravel above high-water mark and line it with pebbles, seaweed, and other debris. Males and females spend equal amounts of time incubating the eggs, although males tend to incubate more at night.

== Threats ==
The population of hooded plovers has declined in eastern Australia as a result of disturbance by people, dogs, cats and horses, as well as predation by silver gulls (Larus novaehollandiae), ravens (Corvus spp) and introduced foxes. Fox predation is a major threat to the western subspecies. In 2000, the number of mature individuals was estimated at 7,000. As of 2025, the population had fallen to an estimated 5,350 – 5,500 mature individuals; the species is currently classified as Near Threatened by the IUCN.

== Conservation ==
Conservation Status by Region
	AUS	NSW	VIC	TAS	SA	WA
Thinornis cucullatus	Vulnerable	Critically endangered	Vulnerable	Conservation Concern	Vulnerable	

=== Important Bird Areas ===
BirdLife International has identified the following sites as being important for hooded plover conservation:

South Australia

- Coffin Bay
- Coorong
- Kangaroo Island

Tasmania

- Cape Portland
- Eastern Flinders Island
- King Island
- Marion Bay
- Melaleuca to Birchs Inlet
- North-west Tasmanian Coast
- Robbins Passage and Boullanger Bay
- St Helens

Victoria

- Corner Inlet
- Discovery Bay to Piccaninnie Ponds
- Phillip Island
- Port Fairy to Warrnambool
- Yambuk

Western Australia

- Lake Gore System
- Lake Warden System
- Pink Lake
- Yalgorup

== See also ==
- Sanderling
