= Port Fairy to Warrnambool Important Bird Area =

Coordinates: 38°21′33″S 142°22′52″E

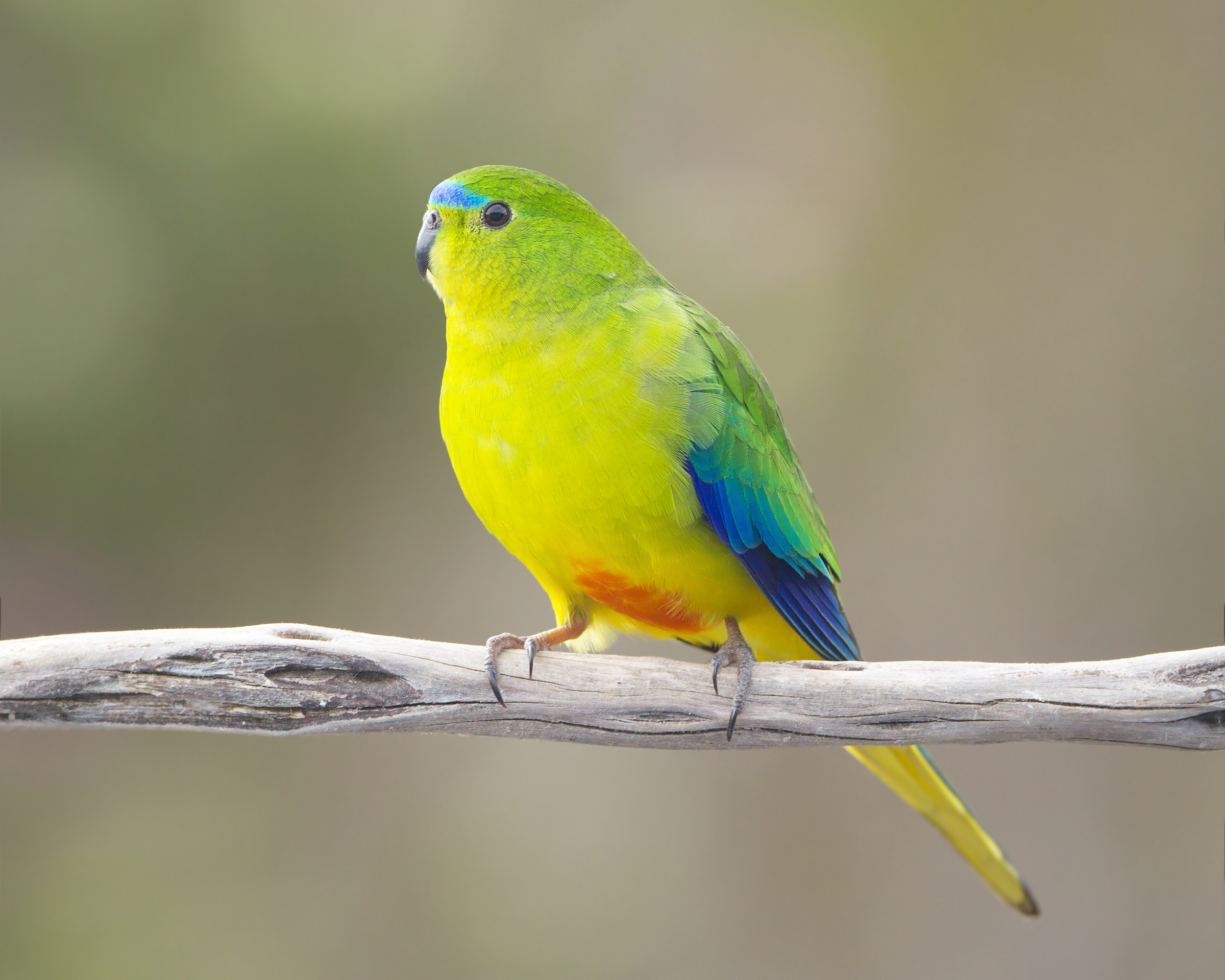
The IBA is an important site for the orange-bellied parrot

The Port Fairy to Warrnambool Important Bird Area comprises a 14 km^{2} strip of coastal land lying between the town of Port Fairy to the west and the regional city of Warrnambool to the east, in south-western Victoria, Australia.

== Description ==
The site consists of beach and associated coastal vegetation along 17 km of coastline. One of its two prominent plant communities is a dense coastal dune shrubland composed of medium shrubs, such as coast wattle and coast beard-heath, above a ground cover of grasses, herbs and sedges. The other is a mosaic of aquatic herbland, coastal saltmarsh and damp saline pasture, composed of species such as beaded glasswort, creeping brookweed, shiny swamp-mat, buck's-horn plantain and fat-hen.

== Birds ==
The site has been identified by BirdLife International as an Important Bird Area (IBA) because it supports a breeding population of hooded plovers and serves as a wintering site for orange-bellied parrots.
