= Dalyup River =

River in Western Australia

Coordinates: 33°46′14″S 121°31′59″E

Location
- Country: Australia

Physical characteristics
- Source
  - location: West of Scaddan
  - elevation: 159 metres (522 ft)
- Mouth
  - location: Lake Gore
- Length: 54 kilometres (34 mi)
- Basin size: 82,607 hectares (204,126 acres)
- Discharge
  - average: 11,000 ML/a (12 cu ft/s)

Dalyup River is a river in the Goldfields-Esperance region of Western Australia.

When Surveyor General John Septimus Roe visited the river in 1848, he named it the Gore River, after one of Captain James Cook's crew from the Endeavour, Lieutenant John Gore. The river was charted for the first time as the Dalyup River in 1875. The name Dalyup is the Nyungar word for the king parrot.

The river rises west of Scaddan and flows south into Lake Gore.

The main tributary of the river is the West Dalyup River. Both rivers were formed 30 million years ago in the Oligocene Period resulting from the formation of the Ravensthorpe ramp. The river is an ephemeral system that mainly flows as a result of winter rains. It is the primary source of water for Lake Gore.

The catchment area of the river has only 10% of the natural vegetation remaining; the rest has been cleared for agricultural purposes such as winter cropping or livestock production.
