= Yalgorup National Park =

National park in Western Australia

- IUCN category II (national park)
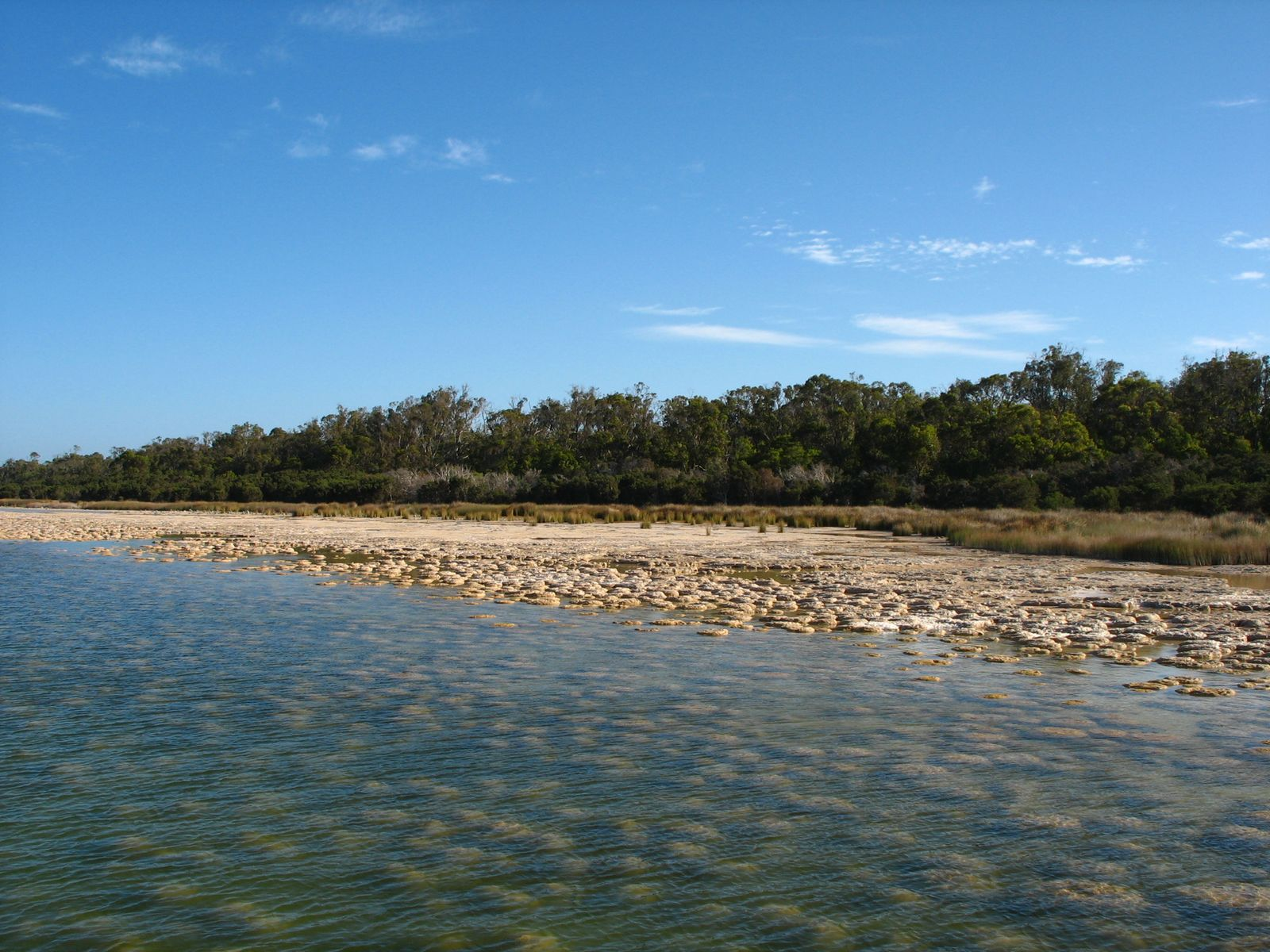
- Stromatolites growing in Yalgorup National Park

- Location within Western Australia
- Location: Western Australia
- Nearest city: Mandurah
- Coordinates: 32°51′26″S 115°40′19″E
- Area: 131.41 km^{2} (50.74 sq mi)
- Established: 1966
- Governing body: Department of Environment and Conservation
- Website: Official website

Yalgorup National Park is a national park in Western Australia, 105 km south of Perth, and directly south of Mandurah.

The park is located on the western edge of the Swan Coastal Plain and contains a chain of about ten lakes; the name rises from the two Noongar words Yalgor meaning lake and -up meaning place of.

The area is part of the Peel-Yalgorup Wetland system, which is classified as a Ramsar Wetland Site and was added to the List of Ramsar wetlands of international importance in 1990. Some of the lakes that make up the system include Boundary Lake, Swan Pond, Lake Pollard, Lake Yalgorup and Newnham Lake.

== Wildlife ==
The wetlands of the park have been identified by BirdLife International as the Yalgorup Important Bird Area because of their importance for waterbirds. Lake Clifton and Lake Preston are both situated within the boundaries of the park and are home to a large variety of bird-life. Black swans, kingfishers, grebes, coots, waterfowl and a variety of parrots and a variety of dotterels can be found in and around the lake habitat.

Woodlands and tuart forests are also found within the park, and contain fauna including western grey kangaroos, emus, brush wallabies, brush-tailed possums, echidna and bandicoots. The quokka was also once found within the area but have been wiped out by foxes.

== See also ==
- Protected areas of Western Australia
