= Quokka =

Conservation status
- Vulnerable (IUCN 3.1)

Scientific classification
- Kingdom: Animalia
- Phylum: Chordata
- Class: Mammalia
- Infraclass: Marsupialia
- Order: Diprotodontia
- Family: Macropodidae
- Subfamily: Macropodinae
- Genus: Setonix; Lesson, 1842
- Species: S. brachyurus

Binomial name
- Setonix brachyurus (Quoy & Gaimard, 1830)
- Geographic range

Small marsupial from southwestern Australia

The quokka (/ˈkwɒkə/; Setonix brachyurus) is a macropod native to Australia. It is about the size of a domestic cat. It is the only member of the genus Setonix. Like other marsupials in the macropod family (such as kangaroos and wallabies), the quokka is herbivorous and mainly nocturnal.

The quokka's range is a small area of southwestern Australia. They inhabit some smaller islands off the coast of Western Australia, particularly Rottnest Island just off Perth and Bald Island near Albany. Isolated, scattered populations also exist in forest and coastal heath between Perth and Albany. A small colony inhabits a protected area of Two Peoples Bay Nature Reserve, where they coexist with the critically endangered Gilbert's potoroo.

== Description ==
A quokka weighs 2.5 to 5.0 kg (5 1/2 to 11 lb) and is 40 to 54 cm (16 to 21 in) long with a 25-to-30 cm-long (9.8-to-12 in) tail, which is quite short for a macropod. It has a stocky build, well developed hind legs, rounded ears, and a short, broad head. Although looking rather like a very small kangaroo, it can climb small trees and shrubs up to 1.5 m (4 ft 11 in). Its coarse fur is a grizzled brown colour, fading to buff underneath. The quokka is known to live for an average of 10 years. Quokkas are nocturnal animals; they sleep during the day in Acanthocarpus preissii, using the plants' spikes for protection and hiding.

Quokkas have a promiscuous mating system. After a month of gestation, females give birth to a single baby called a joey. Females can give birth twice a year and produce 17 joeys on average during their lives. The joey lives in its mother's pouch for 6 months. Once it leaves the pouch, the joey relies on its mother for milk for two more months and is fully weaned around 8 months after birth. Females sexually mature after roughly 18 months. When a female quokka with a joey in her pouch is pursued by a predator, she may drop her baby onto the ground; the joey produces noises, which may serve to attract the predator's attention, while the mother escapes.

== Discovery and name ==
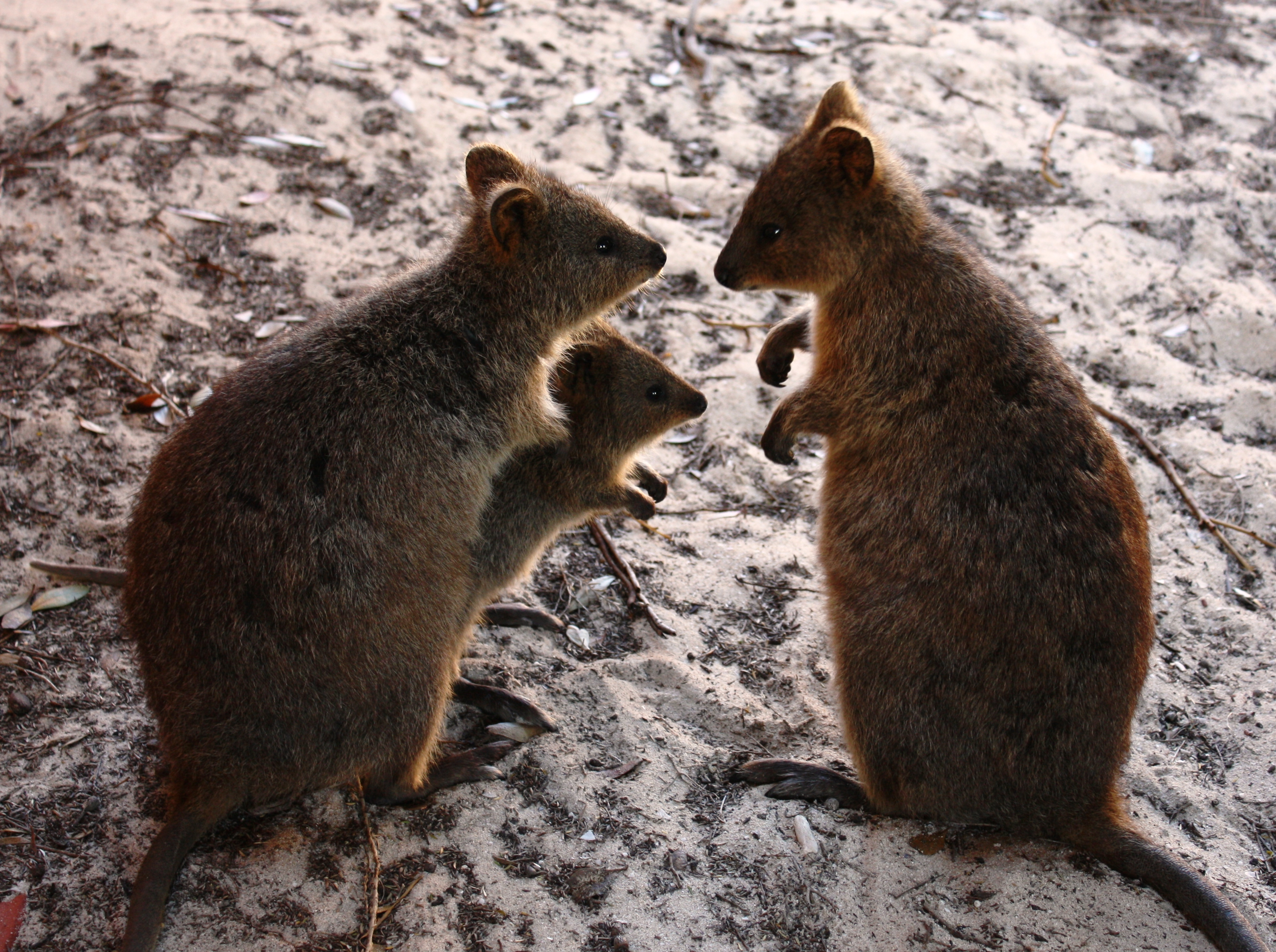
A family of quokkas

The word "quokka" is originally derived from a Noongar word, which was probably gwaga or gawaga. Today, the Noongar people refer to them by either that name or another that has been variously rendered in English as ban-gup or bungeup.

In 1658, Dutch mariner Samuel Volckertszoon wrote of sighting "a wild cat" on the island. In 1696, Dutch explorer Willem de Vlamingh mistook them for giant rats, and renamed the Wadjemup Island 't Eylandt 't Rottenest, which means "the rat nest island" in Dutch. Vlamingh had originally described them "as a kind of rat as big as a common cat".

== Ecology ==
On the mainland, quokkas prefer areas with more vegetation, both for a wider variety of food and also for cover from predators such as dingoes, red foxes, and feral cats. In the wild, the quokka is restricted to a very small range in the South West region of Western Australia, with a number of small scattered populations. A large population exists on Rottnest Island with a smaller one on Bald Island near Albany. These islands are free of the aforementioned predators. On Rottnest, quokkas are common and occupy a variety of habitats, ranging from semiarid scrub to cultivated gardens. Prickly Acanthocarpus plants, which are unaccommodating for humans and other relatively large animals to walk through, provide their favourite daytime shelter for sleeping. Additionally, they are known for their ability to climb trees.

== Diet ==
Like most macropods, quokkas eat many types of vegetation, including grasses, sedges and leaves. A study found that Guichenotia ledifolia, a small shrub species of the family Malvaceae, is one of the quokka's favoured foods. Rottnest Island visitors are urged to never feed quokkas, in part because eating "human food" such as bread can cause dehydration and malnourishment, both of which are detrimental to the quokka's health. Despite the relative lack of fresh water on Rottnest Island, quokkas do have high water requirements, which they satisfy mostly through eating vegetation. On the mainland, quokkas only live in areas that have 600 mm (24 in) or more of rain per year. The quokkas chew their cud, similar to cattle.

== Population ==
A quokka on Rottnest Island

At the time of colonial settlement, the quokka was widespread and abundant, with its distribution encompassing an area of about 41,200 km^{2} (15,900 sq mi) of the South West of Western Australia, including the two offshore islands, Bald and Rottnest. By 1992, following extensive population declines in the 20th century, the quokka's distribution on the mainland had been reduced by more than 50% to an area of about 17,800 km^{2} (6,900 sq mi).

Despite being numerous on the small, offshore islands, the quokka is classified as vulnerable. On the mainland, where it is threatened by introduced predatory species such as red foxes, cats, and dogs, it requires dense ground cover for refuge. Clearfell logging, agricultural development, and housing expansion have reduced their habitat, contributing to the decline of the species, as has the clearing and burning of the remaining swamplands. Moreover, quokkas usually have a litter size of one and successfully rear one young each year. Although they are constantly mating, usually one day after the young are born, the small litter size, along with the restricted space and threatening predators, contributes to the scarcity of the species on the mainland.

An estimated 4,000 quokkas live on the mainland, with nearly all mainland populations being groups of fewer than 50, although one declining group of over 700 occurs in the southern forest between Nannup and Denmark. In 2015, an extensive bushfire near Northcliffe nearly eradicated one of the local mainland populations, with an estimated 90% of the 500 quokkas dying.

In 2007, the quokka population on Rottnest Island was estimated at between 8,000 and 12,000. Snakes are the quokka's only predator on the island. The population on smaller Bald Island, where the quokka has no predators, is 600–1,000. At the end of summer and into autumn, a seasonal decline of quokkas occurs on Rottnest Island, where loss of vegetation and reduction of available surface water can lead to starvation.

This species saw the most significant decline from 1930 to the 1990s, when their distribution was reduced by over half. The quokka markedly declined in its abundance and distribution in the early 1930s, and this tendency has continued till today. Their presence on the mainland has declined to such an extent that they are only found in small groups in bushland surrounding Perth. In late 2024, a new quokka population was discovered in the Perth Hills. It is the first time that quokkas have been photographed by the general public in the Perth Hills and is an important finding for conservation of the species. Their exact location will remain confidential. The quokka is now listed as vulnerable in accordance with the IUCN criteria.

== Conservation ==
The quokka, while not in complete danger of going extinct, is considered threatened. As the climate continues to change, so does the Australian landscape; being herbivores, the quokka rely on many native plants for their diet, as well as protection. The quokkas were found to prefer Malvaceae species as a main source of food, using shrubs as shelter during the hottest points of the day. Due to factors such as wildfires and human influence, the location of the natural flora has been changing, making it harder for them to access. Invasive species and environmental changes are the primary threats to quokkas. A study found that the mainland populations prefers to live in areas with an average rainfall that exceeded 700 mm but fell below 1,000 mm, which becomes increasingly complicated as aridity continues to increase in Southwest Australia.

Increasing temperatures have also been found to play an important role in the distribution of the quokka, as the mean annual temperatures have increased rapidly since the 1970s in the southwest of Western Australia. With climate change limiting the optimal living conditions of the quokka and changing the abundance of their diet, the quokka are listed as vulnerable on the IUCN Red List of threatened species. The increasing risk of severe bushfires presents a serious risk to quokkas, as quokka populations have a slow recovery rate after bushfires and take a long time to recolonise intensely burnt landscapes.

== Human interaction ==
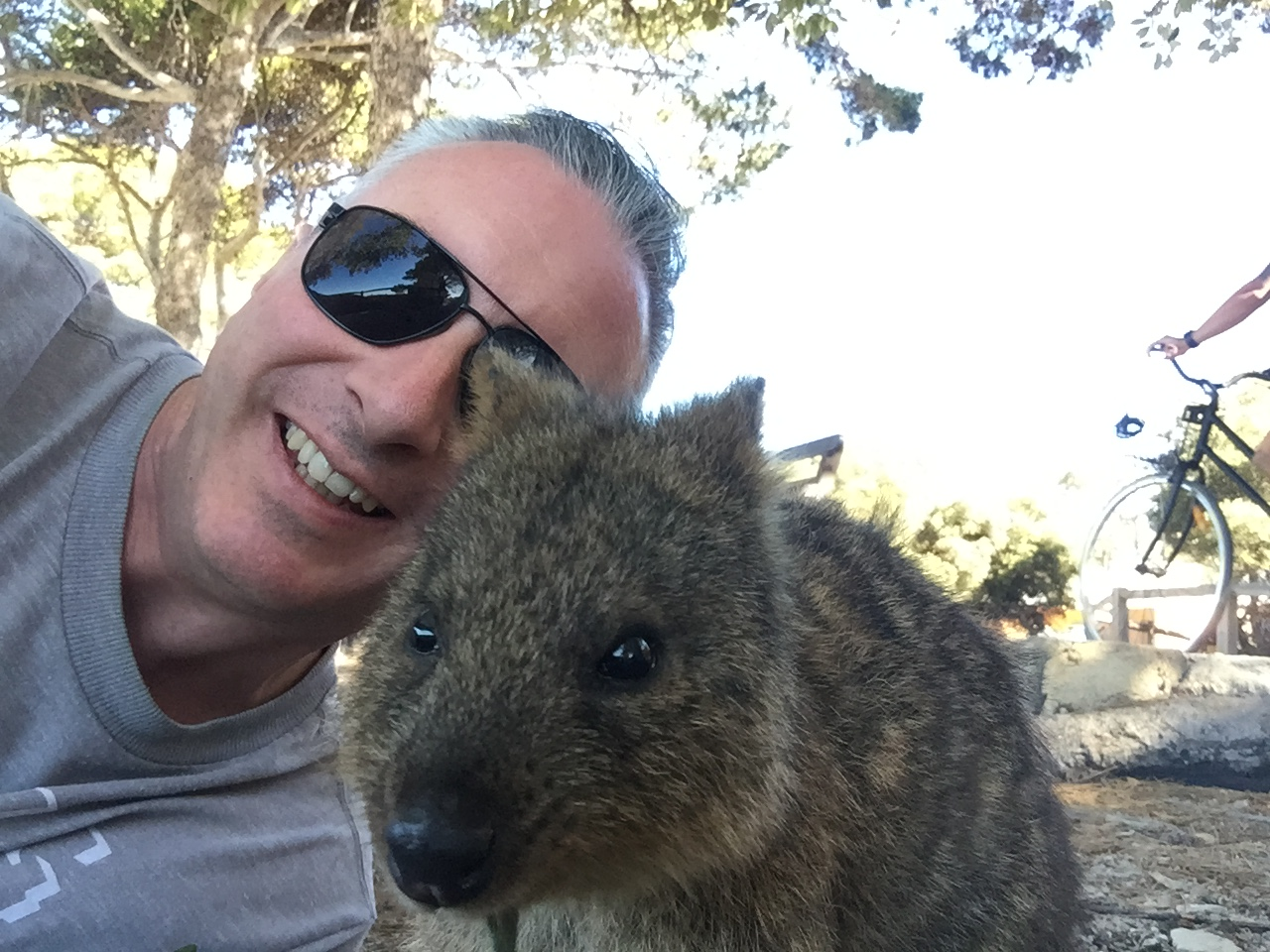
A man taking a selfie with a quokka

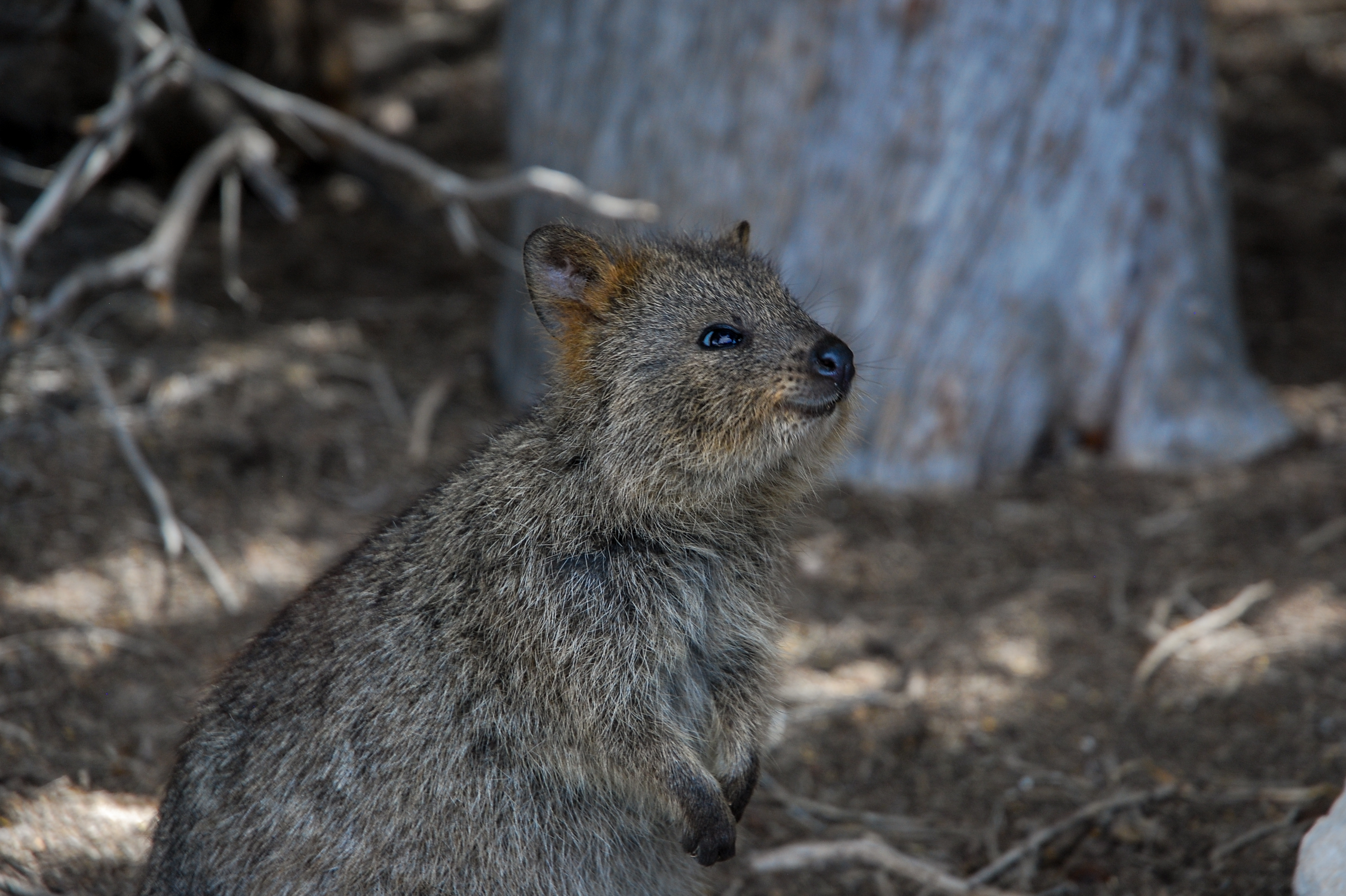
A Rottnest island quokka showing typical "smiling" facial structure

Quokkas have little fear of humans and commonly approach people closely, particularly on Rottnest Island, where they are abundant. Although quokkas are approachable, a few dozen cases occur annually of quokkas biting people, especially children.

Restrictions exist regarding feeding and handling. Handling the animals in any way is illegal for members of the public, and feeding, particularly of "human food", is especially discouraged, as they can easily get sick. An infringement notice carrying a $300 fine can be issued by the Rottnest Island Authority for such an offence, and arrests and detention can be made by Rottnest Island Police. The maximum penalty for animal cruelty is a $50,000 fine and a five-year prison sentence.

In addition to restrictions on human interactions with quokkas, they have been tested to be potentially harmful to humans with their high Salmonella infection rates, especially in the summer heat. This has been proven by scientists, who have taken blood tests on wild quokkas on Rottnest Island. Quokkas can also be observed at several zoos and wildlife parks around Australia, including Perth Zoo, Taronga Zoo, Wild Life Sydney, Australia Zoo, Adelaide Zoo, and Caversham Wildlife Park. Physical interaction is generally not permitted without explicit permission from supervising staff.

Quokka behaviour in response to human interaction has been examined in zoo environments. One brief study indicated fewer animals remained visible from the visitor paths when the enclosure was an open or walk-through environment. This may have been due to the quokkas acquiring avoidance behaviour of visitors, which the authors propose has implications for stress management in their exhibition to the public.

=== Quokka selfies ===
In the mid-2010s, quokkas earned a reputation on the internet as "the world's happiest animals" and symbols of positivity, as frontal photos of their faces make them appear to be smiling (they do not, in fact "smile"; the resemblance to a human smile is due to a coincidental facial structure). Many photos of smiling quokkas have since gone viral, and the "quokka selfie" has become a popular social-media trend, with celebrities such as Chris Hemsworth, Shawn Mendes, Margot Robbie, Roger Federer, and Kim Donghyuk of iKON taking part in the activity. Tourist numbers to Rottnest Island have subsequently increased.

== See also ==
- Pademelon
