= Pimelea clavata =

Scientific classification
- Kingdom: Plantae
- Clade: Tracheophytes
- Clade: Angiosperms
- Clade: Eudicots
- Clade: Rosids
- Order: Malvales
- Family: Thymelaeaceae
- Genus: Pimelea
- Species: P. clavata

Binomial name
- Pimelea clavata Labill.

Synonyms
- Banksia clavata (Lavill.) Kuntze; Banksia viridula Lindb.

Species of shrub

Pimelea clavata is a species of flowering plant in the family Thymelaeaceae and is endemic to near-coastal areas and offshore islands of southern Western Australia. It is an erect shrub with narrowly elliptic to more or less linear leaves arranged in opposite pairs, and head-like clusters of white to pale yellow, tube-shaped flowers surrounded by leaf-like involucral bracts.

== Description ==
Pimelea clavata is an erect shrub that typically grows to a height of 1–5 m (3 ft 3 in – 16 ft 5 in) and has stems that are hairy near the flowers. The leaves are arranged in opposite pairs, narrowly elliptic to more or less linear, 6–43 mm (0.24–1.69 in) long and 1.5–9 mm (0.059–0.354 in) wide on a short petiole. The flowers are white to pale yellow, densely hairy, and borne in compact, head-like groups surrounded by two involucral bracts that are similar to the leaves but smaller, each flower on a densely hairy pedicel. The floral tube is 2–4 mm (0.079–0.157 in) long, the sepals 1.2–2.0 mm (0.047–0.079 in) long. Flowering occurs from September to February.

== Taxonomy ==
Pimelea clavata was first formally described in 1805 by Jacques Labillardière in Novae Hollandiae plantarum specimen. The specific epithet (clavata) means "club-shaped", referring to the peduncle.

== Distribution and habitat ==
This pimelea grows on coastal dunes, in forest near watercourses or temporary lakes, and on limestone ciffs between Margaret River and Bald Island and on nearby offshore islands in the Esperance Plains, Jarrah Forest and Warren bioregions of southern Western Australia.

== Conservation status ==
Pimelea clavata is listed as "not threatened" by the Government of Western Australia Department of Biodiversity, Conservation and Attractions.
