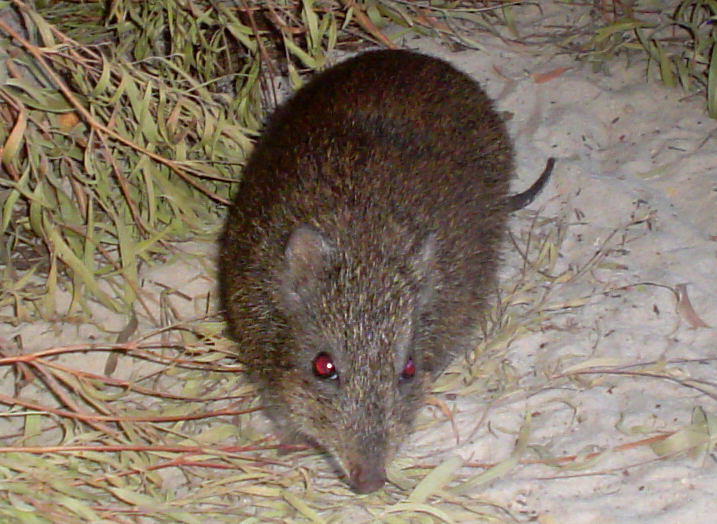
- Gilbert's potoroo from Two Peoples Bay, February 2009

Conservation status
- Critically Endangered (IUCN 3.1)

Scientific classification
- Kingdom: Animalia
- Phylum: Chordata
- Class: Mammalia
- Infraclass: Marsupialia
- Order: Diprotodontia
- Family: Potoroidae
- Genus: Potorous
- Species: P. gilbertii

Binomial name
- Potorous gilbertii Gould, 1841.
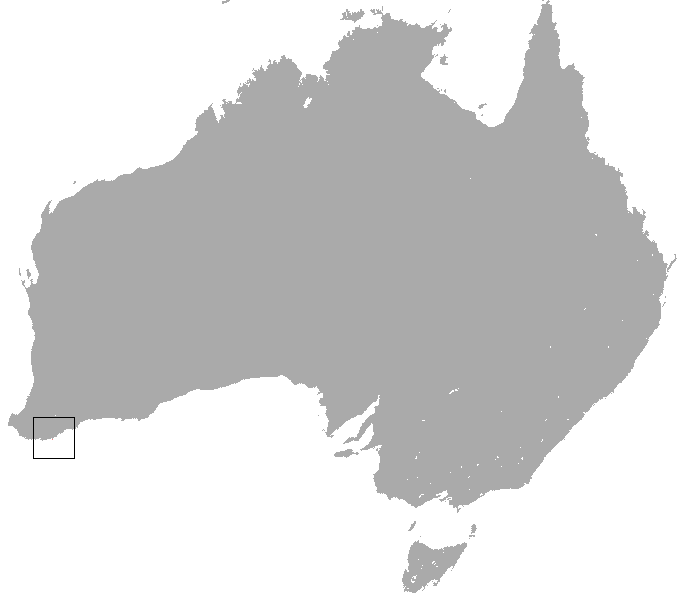
- Gilbert's potoroo range

= Gilbert's potoroo =

Species of marsupial

Gilbert's potoroo or ngilkat (Potorous gilbertii) is Australia's most endangered marsupial, the rarest marsupial in the world, and one of the world's rarest critically endangered mammals, found in south-western Western Australia. It is a small nocturnal macropod that lives in small groups.

It was thought to be extinct for much of the 20th century, having not been spotted for around a century, until its rediscovery in 1994. The only naturally located population is found in Two Peoples Bay Nature Reserve in Western Australia, where they co-exist with quokkas (Setonix brachyurus), but in 2015, a bushfire destroyed 90% of their habitat. Small populations are being established at Bald Island, off Albany, and more recently on Middle Island, off Esperance, all on the southern coast of Western Australia. Numbers have increased in recent years, and as of December 2018, the entire population was estimated to comprise at least 100 individuals, with 10 on Middle Island, 70 on Bald Island, 20 at Waychinicup National Park, and two at Two Peoples Bay (also known as the Mt Gardner population).

== History and naming ==
Gilbert's potoroo was one of first species noticed as disappearing after British colonisation and remarkable in its rediscovery at the end of the 20th century. The relict population at Two Peoples Bay, around 40 individuals in 2014, had survived the factors that caused the mass decline of Australian mammals in a critical weight range of species smaller and larger than themselves. The earliest records of the species are found in the letters and field notes of John Gilbert, repeated by John Gould and later authors, as the only source of information on the living species.

Gould published the existing name in the Nyungar language as "grul-gyte" (1841) and later "ngil-gyte" (1863), the second name matching Gilbert's own field notes as the name reported to him at King George Sound. A similar name was given in various other ways in the early wordlists of Isaac Scott Nind (nailoit) and George Fletcher Moore (garlgyte) as and others, and rendered as ngilkat in an ethnohistoric review published in 2001.

The author proposed the species name Hypsiprymnus gilbertii with an explanation in A Monograph of the Macropodidae, or Family of Kangaroos,

In dedicating it to Mr. Gilbert, who proceeded with me to Australia to assist in the objects of my expedition, and who is still prosecuting his researches on the northern portion of that continent, I embrace with pleasure the opportunity thus afforded me of expressing my sense of the great zeal and assiduity he has displayed in the objects of his mission; and as science is indebted to Mr. Gilbert for the knowledge of this and several other interesting discoveries, I trust that, however objectionable it may be to name species after individuals, in this instance it will not be deemed inappropriate. Gould, 1841.

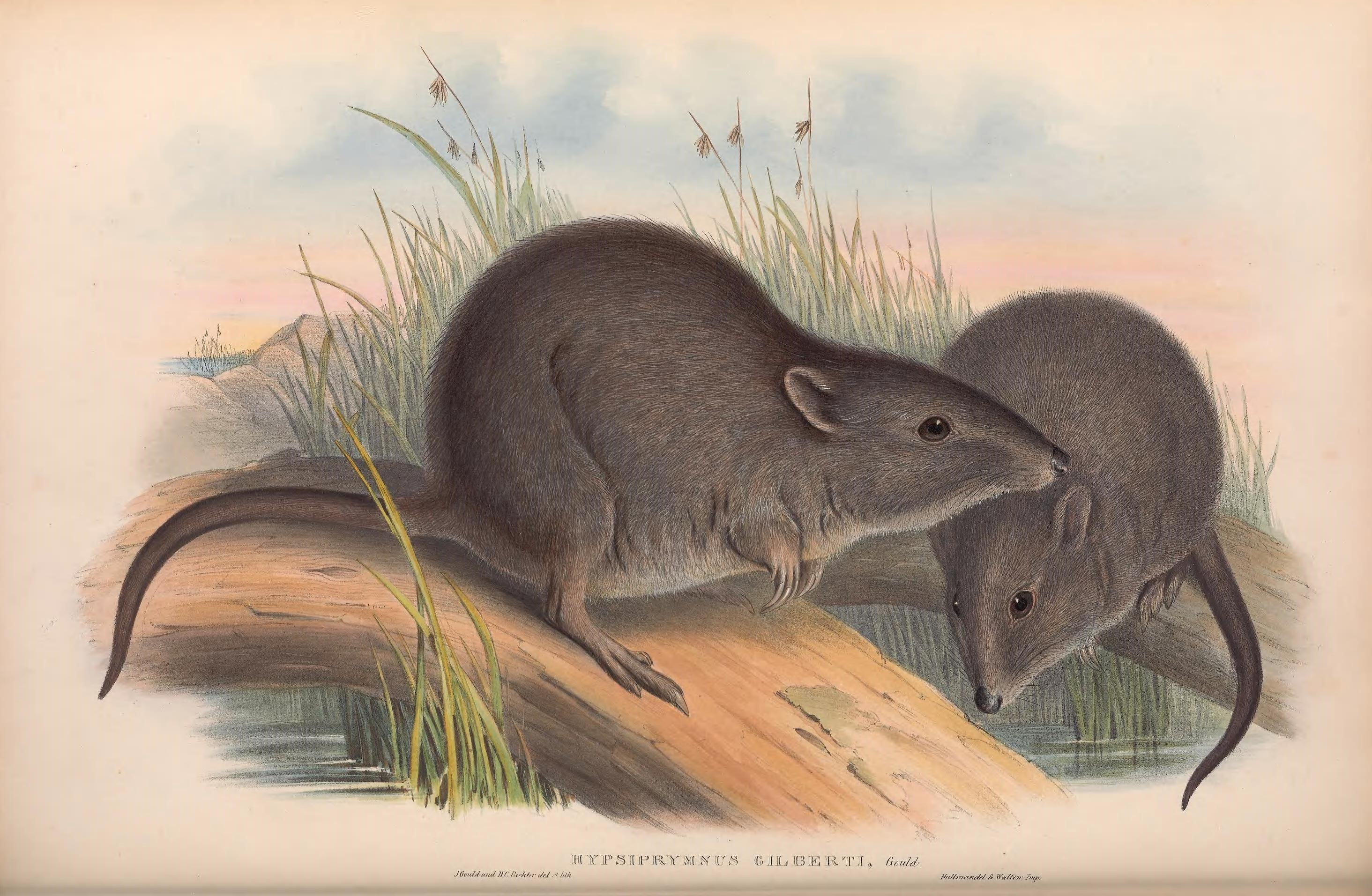
Illustration by Richter in Gould's Mammals of Australia (1863)

After the collection of the first specimen in 1840, when Gilbert had reported to Gould that the species was locally common, the success of field workers in finding the animal was little and then none until the rediscovery in the late 20th century. Gould's description gives a report by Gilbert that the local Nyungar people caught them in "immense numbers" on a single hunt. A letter of James Drummond notes a series of specimens assembled by his son, around a dozen from an unspecified location. Gerard Krefft also noted that George Masters, a highly active collector of the Albany district, obtained around five to eight specimens in 1866 and a pair in 1869. Later workers known to have made extensive collections in the area, including Shortridge and John Tunney, failed to record this species in the southern districts by the end of the 19th century.

The few known historical records of the potoroo are all at the southwestern coast of Southwest Australia, summarised as those around King George Sound during 1843, 1866, 1869, and 1875, and the uncertain date of 1890s to the west.

=== Rediscovery ===
The species was presumed to be extinct, having not been spotted in around a century, years before it was rediscovered in 1994 in Two Peoples Bay Nature Reserve. Liz Sinclair had been doing research on wallabies, and caught the potoroo in one of her traps. She then compared her captured specimen with the skeletons of past potoroos, and proved it was indeed a Gilbert's potoroo.

No other known wild population has been found after the rediscovery at Two Peoples Bay, and in November 2015, an estimated 15 of the 20 remaining individuals there were killed, and 90% of the species' habitat destroyed, by a large bushfire. Fortunately, seven of the potoroos were rescued before the fire swept through.

By 2007, it was already considered that size of the population placed the potoroo on the edge of extinction, and the fate and trajectory of the species was considered precarious.

== Taxonomy ==
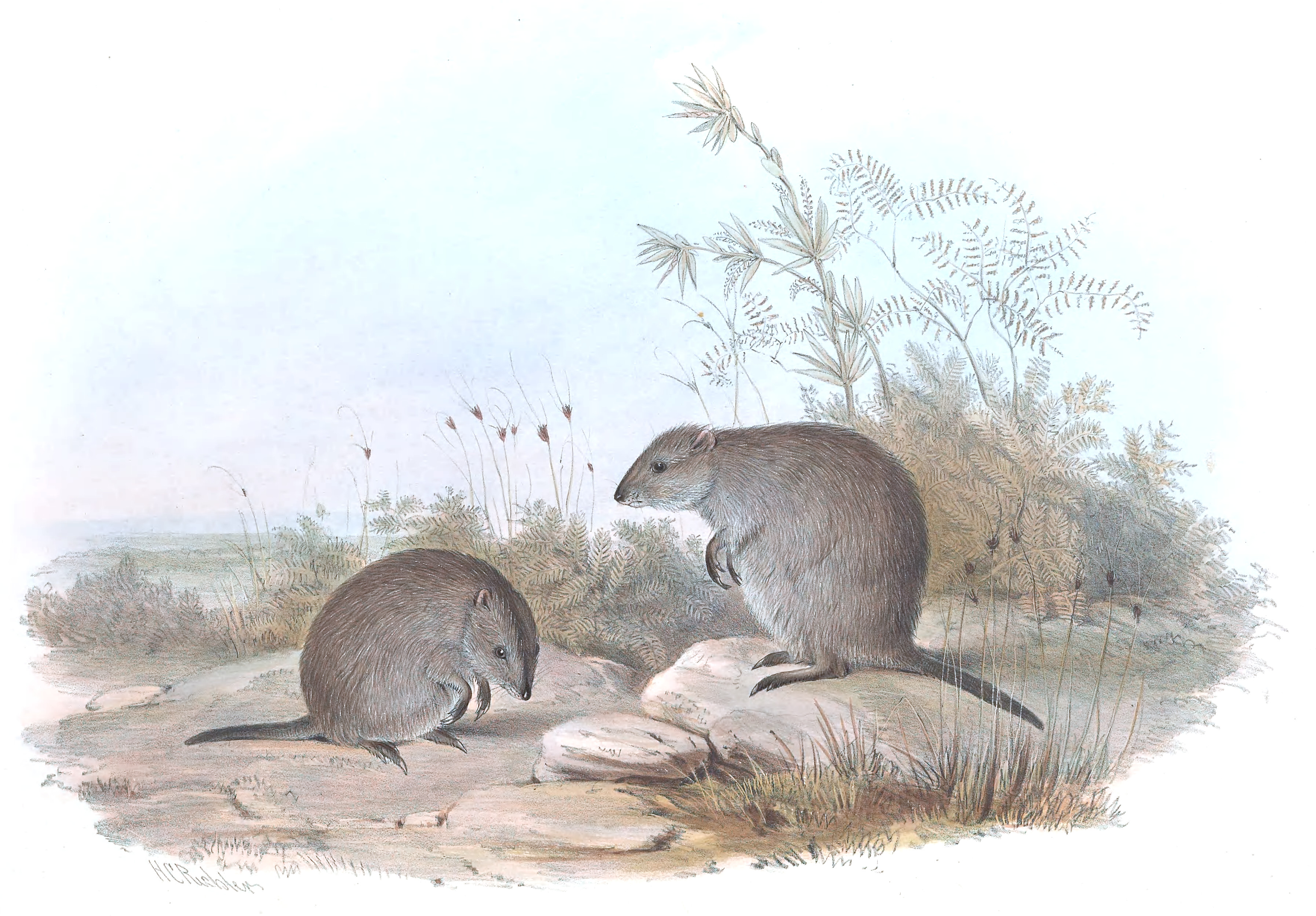
Illustration by H. C. Richter, accompanying Gould's 1841 description

A description of the species was published by John Gould in his Monograph of Macropodidae (1841), which included an illustration of the species by H. C. Richter. The name was published in the Proceedings of the Zoological Society of London, reporting Gould's presentation of the specimen at its meeting on 9 February 1841. Gould placed the new species with the genus Hypsiprymnus, and the taxon was later assigned to the genus Potorous. A specimen of the animal was collected by the field worker John Gilbert at King George Sound, while collecting birds and mammals for Gould at the new colonies in the southwest of Australia. The holotype is a female skin and skull placed at the British Museum of Natural History, a specimen that was also named as Hypsiprymnus micropus G. R. Waterhouse 1841. Gould's description was later submerged as a subspecies or recognised as a synonym of other potoroine taxa, and was referred to as Potorous tridactylus in taxonomic and conservation listings. Until the rediscovery of the species, the material available limited any comparison with its related taxa. An analysis of the new material and revision of the genus Potorous confirmed what Gilbert had supposed when he collected the first specimen, and the taxon was again recognised as a species.

The specific epithet was nominated by Gould to recognise John Gilbert and suggested the trivial name of Gilbert's rat kangaroo. Gould also provides the name used at King George Sound, given as grul-gyte. A review of historical records for the names in the Nyungar language proposed the adoption of ngilkat [ngil'kat] as the regular spelling of its preferred common name.

== Description ==
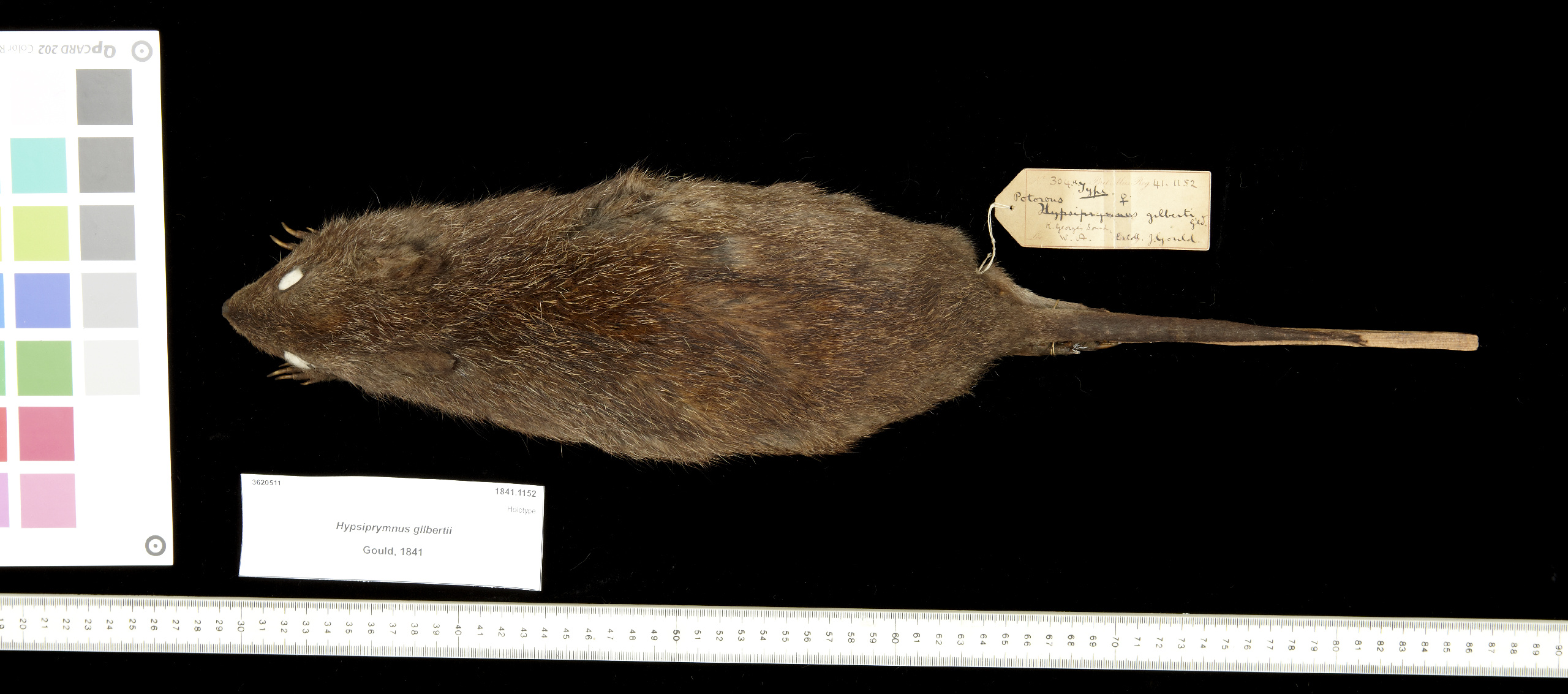
Dorsal skin (Natural History Museum, London, 1841)

Gilbert's potoroo is a small species of Potorous with a fur colour that is rufous brown across the upper side and light grey beneath. It has long hind feet and front feet with curved claws, which it uses to dig for food. Its body has large amounts of fur, which helps with insulation, and its fur ranges between brown and grey, the colour fading on its belly. This potoroo has a long, thin snout curving downward that it uses to smell its surroundings; this trait is common in all potoroo species. Its eyes appear to bulge out of its face and look as though they are on an angle, and its ears are almost invisible, buried under thick fur. Male and female body types are similar and are both within the same size range. Adult females range in weight from 708–1,205 g (25.0–42.5 oz) (including pouch young where present), whereas adult males range in weight from 845–1,200 g (29.8–42.3 oz).

The length of the head and body combined is 270–290 mm (11–11 in), with the average is being 250 mm (9.8 in), and is proportionately less than the length of the tail, which is 215–230 mm (8.5–9.1 in) and averages 223 mm (8.8 in).

The measurement of the hind foot is 65–70 mm (2.6–2.8 in) and proportionally less than the length of the head. Their short ears are covered in greyish fur and rounded in their profile, the fur is also grey over the muzzle. The recorded weight range of the species is 785–965 g (27.7–34.0 oz). The tail of P. gilbertii tapers away from the body and is covered with only a small amount of hair.

Their lifespan is about 10 years.

== Distribution and habitat ==
Gilbert's potoroo was once found in a large distribution range across south-west Australia, but seems to have been locally restricted. Sites at Cape Naturaliste and Cape Leeuwin have produced subfossil remains that show the range extended to the west of the King George Sound region at some point in recent history. The physical and anecdotal ranges included the areas around King George Sound and near the Margaret River, but the native range became reduced to the Mount Gardner headland at Two Peoples Bay (hence the naming of this population as the Mt Gardner population). Within that area of less than 1,000 ha (2,500 acres), the species occupies four separate areas of dense shrubland within valleys on the mount's slopes; Mount Gardner provides a habitat that has been isolated from changed fire regimens. These areas are described as a Melaleuca striata and Melaleuca uncinata shrubland, between 1.5 and 2.0 m tall with 70–100% canopy cover, and a dense layer of sedges including Lepidosperma spp. and Anarthria scabra as the understorey. The vegetation forming its habitat has not been burnt for over 50 years, so that long-unburnt areas are thought to be necessary for the species.

Recent conservation and translocation measures have had some success in increasing the population.

The foraging activity of Gilbert's potoroo is nocturnal; it remains hidden in dense undergrowth during the day, and rarely crosses large open areas.

== Diet ==
Study of the species' diet is limited to the relict population discovered at Two Peoples Bay and is found to be similar to that of P. tridactylus. Gilbert's potoroo is primarily mycophagous, a diet that consists of multiple species of truffle-like fungi. It may also consume fleshy fruits, as seeds have been found in the scat, but how important this is to its diet is unknown. Australia has the majority of fungal varieties, and Gilbert's potoroo eats a variety of them. From translocation of the potoroo, the species was found to survive on many different kinds of fungi, not limited to the species available in its habitat at Two Peoples Bay.

As with many of the potoroine species, the primary type of fungus consumed is hypogeous, with the above-ground fruiting bodies of epigeous fungi forming only a minor part of their diet. Plant matter consumed includes leaves and stems, and invertebrates have also been recorded in the excreta; this has been regarded as incidental ingestion while eating subterranean fungi. About 90% of the volume of material consumed is hypogeous fungus. The spores of five fungal species have been recorded in faecal matter throughout the year; the total number is around 40 species.

Gilbert's potoroo has sharp, three-toed claws that help it dig into the ground to unearth fungi. After digestion, the potoroo aids in spore distribution, as the spores germinate from its faeces.

== Reproduction ==
A female Gilbert's potoroo can have two babies in a year, while carrying only one at a time. It has the ability to keep a second embryo in a state of diapause while the first embryo is growing. If the first baby does not go to term, the second baby starts growing right away. The gestation period for this species is unknown, but is estimated to be similar to the long-nosed potoroo at 38 days. Since so few are alive today, much of the reproductive cycle for Gilbert's potoroo remains unknown. The main breeding period is thought to be November–December, with similar breeding patterns to those of the long-nosed potoroo. Scientists have tried to breed them in captivity, but recent attempts have been unsuccessful, citing diet, incompatibility, and age as possible factors that influenced the lack of reproduction. Reproduction in the wild is thought to be progressing successfully, as many females found in the wild are with young.

== Conservation status and measures ==
Gilbert's potoroo is one of Australia's most critically endangered mammals, and is the rarest marsupial in the world, but its population has increased slightly in recent years owing to translocations. The wild population at Mt Gardner was 30 in 2005, but by 2015 had reduced to 15 (this was after some animals had been translocated). In 2011 the population was estimated to be 70 individuals. As of March 2022, it was estimated to be around 100.

After the rediscovery of Gilbert's potoroo, additional specimens were immediately taken into captivity to try to help to promote more young to be born to help increase the population. A few young were born in the first few years, but then breeding stopped due to age differences and a history of balanoposthitis, a disease that affects the male potoroo's penis and causes inflammation and ulceration if left untreated. This problem exists among the wild population; captive males are treated with antibiotics.

In November 2001, the Gilbert's Potoroo Action Group was formed to help in the education and public awareness of the potoroos. The group also helps with raising funds for their research and captive-breeding programs.

Along with the dwindling number of the species after their rediscovery in Australia, one of the potoroos was found to have some sort of sickness when brought into captivity in early 2000. The scientists who had brought the young male potoroo and its mother into captivity found that the animal had significant loss of appetite, and lost 32% of its body mass within a few weeks. They had observed it moving in circles in captivity and behaving in an odd manner. They had also noticed symptoms of sporadic coughing fits and before its death had seen that the potoroo had actually gone into a state of hypothermia. In a later study of a long-nosed potoroo, the same symptoms were found and were likened to a fatal disease, cryptococcosis, which had been contracted while the animals were in the wild. This could also be a factor why the potoroo population has been dwindling in the wild, because the disease could be killing the young before they are able to reproduce.

A thesis published in 2008 considered the diseases that may affect individuals of P. gilbertii and the remaining population. Some conditions detected in the hosts were associated with novel species of internal and external organisms.

=== Translocation efforts ===
A small population was successfully established on Bald Island between 2005 and 2007 (a total of 10 animals having been moved there, making a total of 14), when just 40 individuals remained in the wild. This was intended as an "insurance population" for those still in the wild at Two Peoples Bay. Remote islands are suitable owing to the absence of feral animals and predators.

In 2010, a second population was established within an enclosure at Waychinicup National Park as a short-term measure, but it was in 2015 found that native carpet pythons were getting into the enclosure and preying on the marsupials.

In 2016, Michaelmas Island, off the coast of Two Peoples Bay, was chosen as a new habitat location. The island's lack of predators was a key factor in its selection, which would provide Gilbert's potoroo with a similar level of long-term protection enjoyed by the quokkas of Rottnest Island, also in Western Australia. Four individuals (rescued from the Two Peoples Bay fire) were translocated, but two died and the remaining two were removed and put back into the Two Peoples reserve after being looked after and fed to regain their normal weight. The animals had stayed only on the granite part, which covers a third of the island, and there had not been enough food to sustain them.

In 2017, four animals were translocated as a temporary trial from Bald Island to Middle Island, a 10.4 km^{2} (4.0 sq mi) island in the Recherche Archipelago. The signs were good, so a second trial began in 2018 with the translocation of 10 animals from Bald Island.

As of December 2018, the entire population was estimated to comprise at least 100 individuals, with 10 on Middle Island, 70 on Bald Island, 20 at Waychinicup and two at Mt Gardner (Two Peoples Bay).

Indigenous rangers are helping to establish and monitor the population on Middle Island, which is around 120 km (75 mi) (and a two-and-a-half-hour boat trip) south-east of Esperance. In July 2022, potoroos were observed on camera in a new location, and a sighting of two adults and a joey showed that they were breeding on the island.
