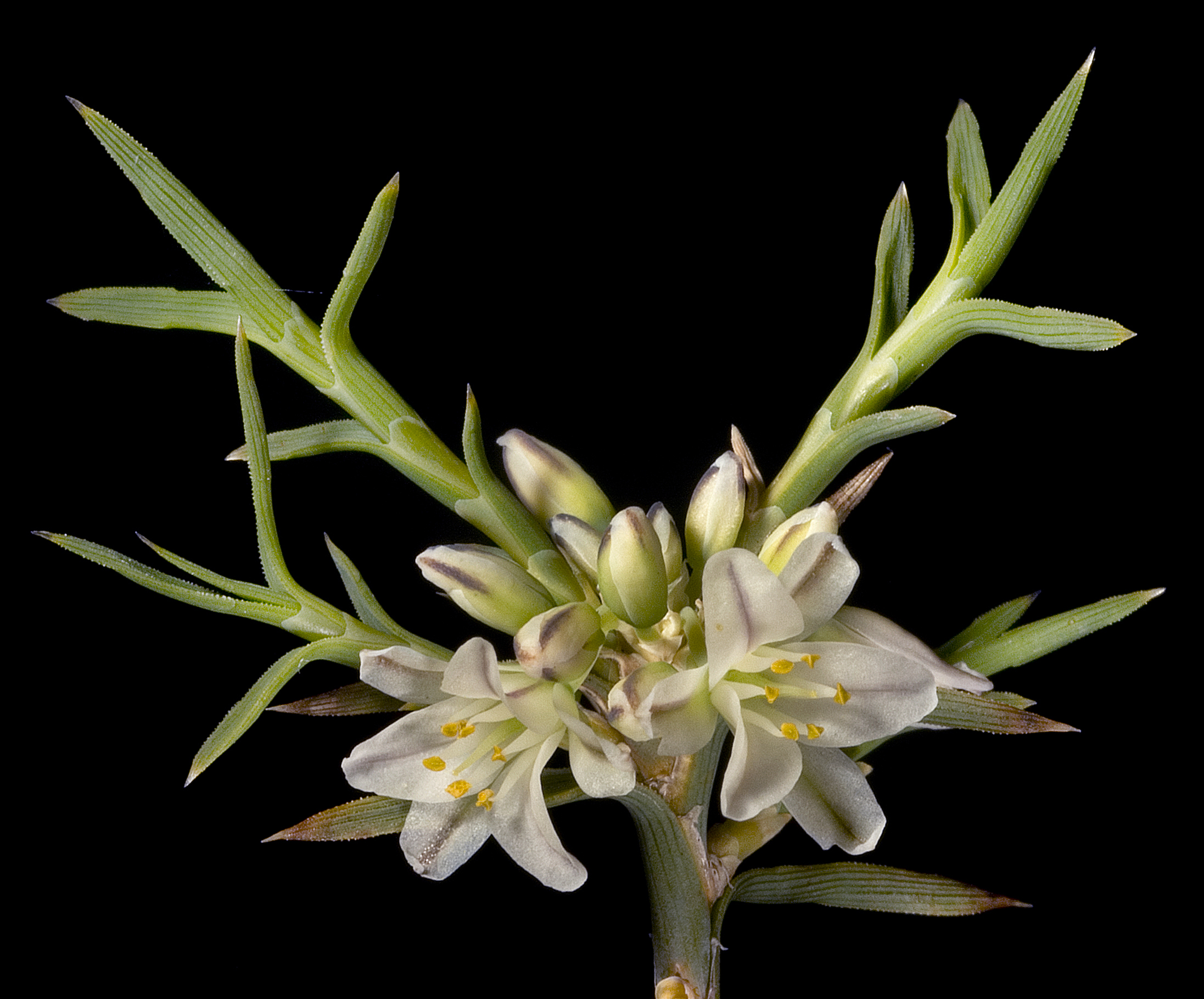
- Acanthocarpus canaliculatus

Scientific classification
- Kingdom: Plantae
- Clade: Tracheophytes
- Clade: Angiosperms
- Clade: Monocots
- Order: Asparagales
- Family: Asparagaceae
- Subfamily: Lomandroideae
- Genus: Acanthocarpus
- Species: A. canaliculatus

Binomial name
- Acanthocarpus canaliculatus A.S.George

= Acanthocarpus canaliculatus =

Species of flowering plant

Acanthocarpus canaliculatus is a rhizomatous perennial that fringes creeks, swamps and salt lakes and on stony sites in Western Australia. White flowers appear between June and October in the species' native range.

== Distribution ==
A. canaliculatus is found in Beard's Eremaean Province and South-West Provinces; and in the more recent biogeographical regions of IBRA: Avon Wheatbelt, Geraldton Sandplains, Jarrah Forest, Swan Coastal Plain, and Yalgoo.
