= Bald Island =

Island in Western Australia

Geography
- Coordinates: 34°55′9.07″S 118°27′45.48″E

Administration
- Australia

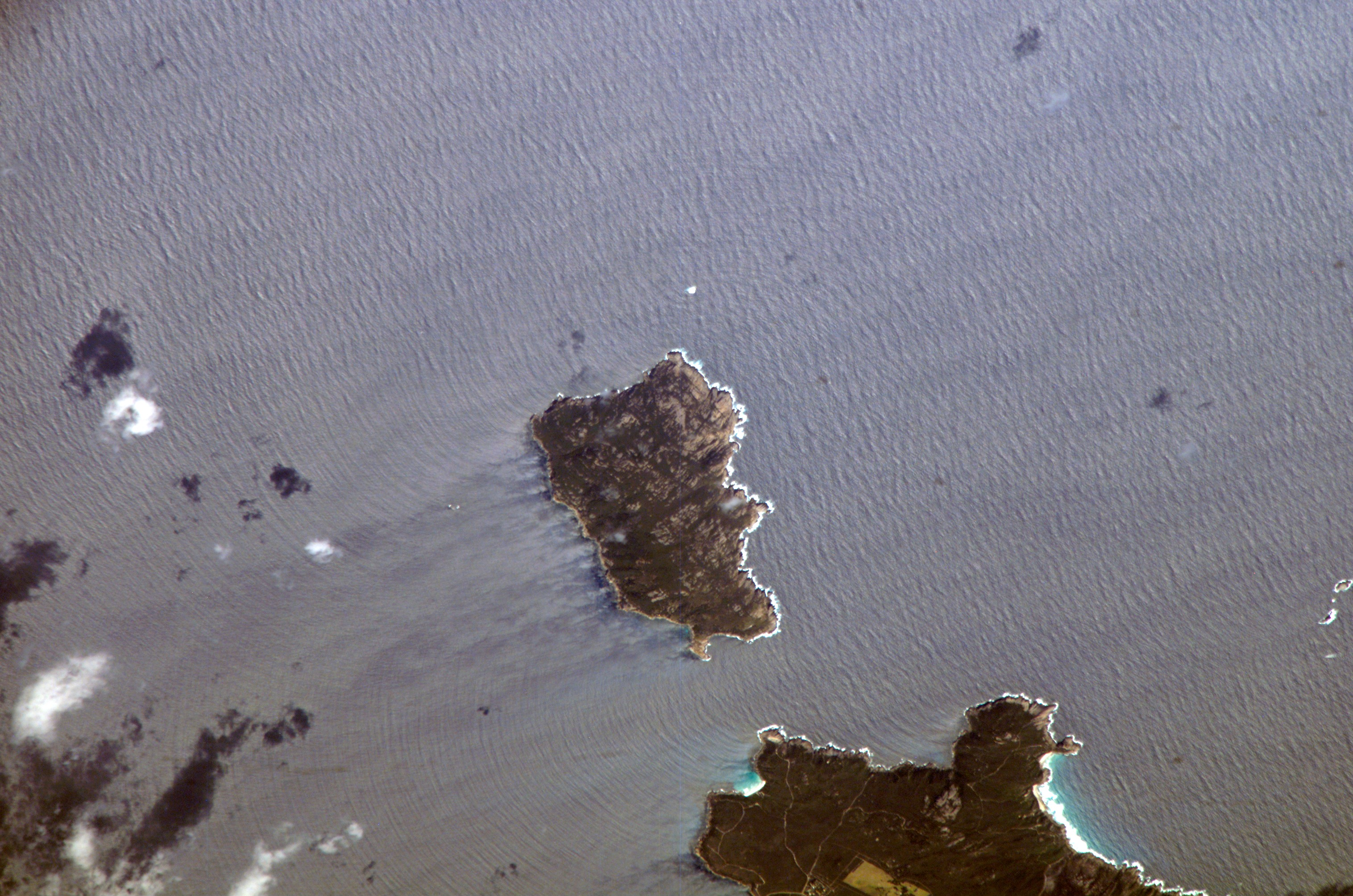
Satellite image of Bald Island on 11 January 2008

Bald Island is an island in the Great Southern region of Western Australia. The island is 1.5 kilometres (1 mi) offshore from Cheynes Beach and is a protected area managed by the Department of Parks and Wildlife.

The island is a World Conservation Union Category IA nature reserve. (A Class A Nature Reserve, No 25869, managed by Parks and Wildlife was created in 1964.) With an area of 8.09 square kilometres (1,999 acres), the island is one of the largest off the south coast. Composed almost entirely of granite, it rises steeply from the ocean to a maximum height of 310 metres (1,017 ft). The island was isolated around 10,000 years ago by rising sea levels.

== Flora ==
The island contains 104 species of plants. Large stands of peppermint trees (Agonis flexuosa) are found on the sheltered upper slopes of the island, while forested stretches of Rottnest Island teatree (Melaleuca lanceolata) grow on the lower slopes. The Bald Island marlock (Eucalyptus conferruminata) forms dense thickets on parts of the island. More exposed areas are covered by open heath and tussock species, as well as closed shrubby patches mostly comprising Melaleuca microphylla.

== Fauna ==
The island supports a population of reptiles - four skinks and one gecko. One of the species of skink, Ctenotus labillardieri, has evolved into a distinctive insular race on the island. There are no snakes on the island. Marine mammals such as New Zealand fur seals and Australian sea lions inhabit Bald Island. There are a few mainland mammals, including the quokka, and a population of Gilbert's potoroo is also being established. The island forms part of the Two Peoples Bay and Mount Manypeaks Important Bird Area, identified as such by BirdLife International because of its significance in the conservation of several rare and threatened bird species. It acts as an important breeding ground for great-winged petrels and little penguins.

=== Translocations of endangered species ===
Due to its remote location, and lack of predators, the island was chosen in August 2005 as a site for the translocation of a Gilbert's potoroo population, with a total of 10 animals moved there, between making a total of 14. At that time just 40 individuals remained in the wild, in Two Peoples Bay Nature Reserve.

Another endangered species translocated to Bald Island is the noisy scrub-bird. In 1992 five males were taken from the Two Peoples Bay area and taken to Bald Island. In 1993 the area was surveyed to show that at least two had survived. In 1993 another three males and three females have been relocated to Bald Island. The estimated population of calling male birds on Bald Island in 2004 is 59 individuals.
