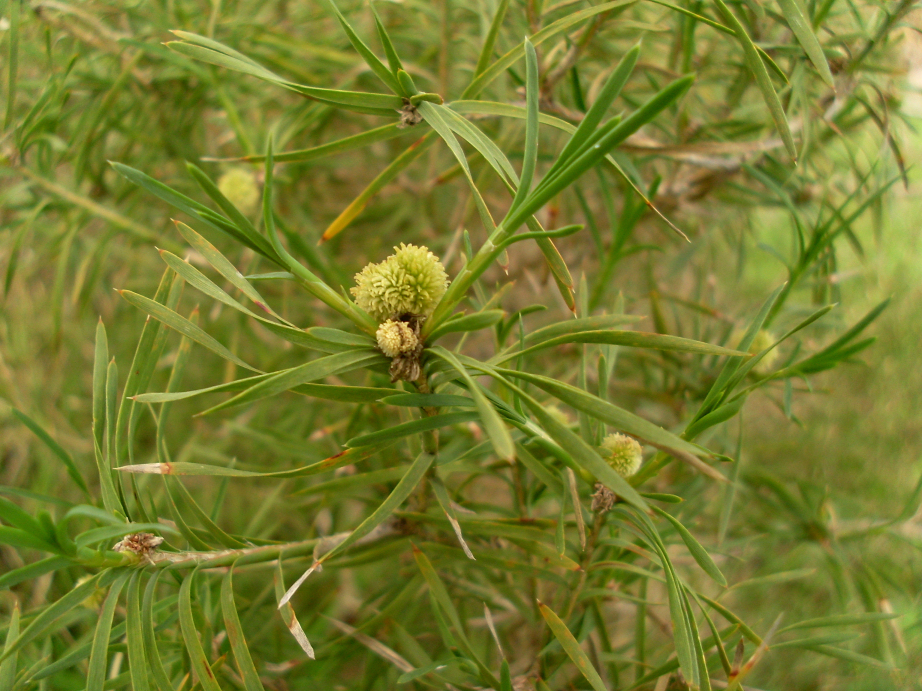
- Acanthocarpus preissii

Scientific classification
- Kingdom: Plantae
- Clade: Tracheophytes
- Clade: Angiosperms
- Clade: Monocots
- Order: Asparagales
- Family: Asparagaceae
- Subfamily: Lomandroideae
- Genus: Acanthocarpus; Lehm.

Synonyms
- Lomandra sect. Acanthocarpus (Lehm.) Kuntze

= Acanthocarpus (plant) =

Genus of flowering plants

Acanthocarpus is a genus in the family Asparagaceae, subfamily Lomandroideae, in the APG III system of classification. It has been difficult to place at family rank, being placed at various times in Dasypogonaceae as well as the Asparagaceae. The entire genus is endemic to the State of Western Australia.

Species include:

- Acanthocarpus canaliculatus A.S.George
- Acanthocarpus humilis A.S.George
- Acanthocarpus parviflorus A.S.George
- Acanthocarpus preissii Lehm.
- Acanthocarpus robustus A.S.George
- Acanthocarpus rupestris A.S.George
- Acanthocarpus verticillatus A.S.George

Formerly included species:

- Acanthocarpus fimbriatus - Chamaexeros fimbriata
- Acanthocarpus mucronatus - Lomandra mucronata
- Acanthocarpus serra - Chamaexeros serra
