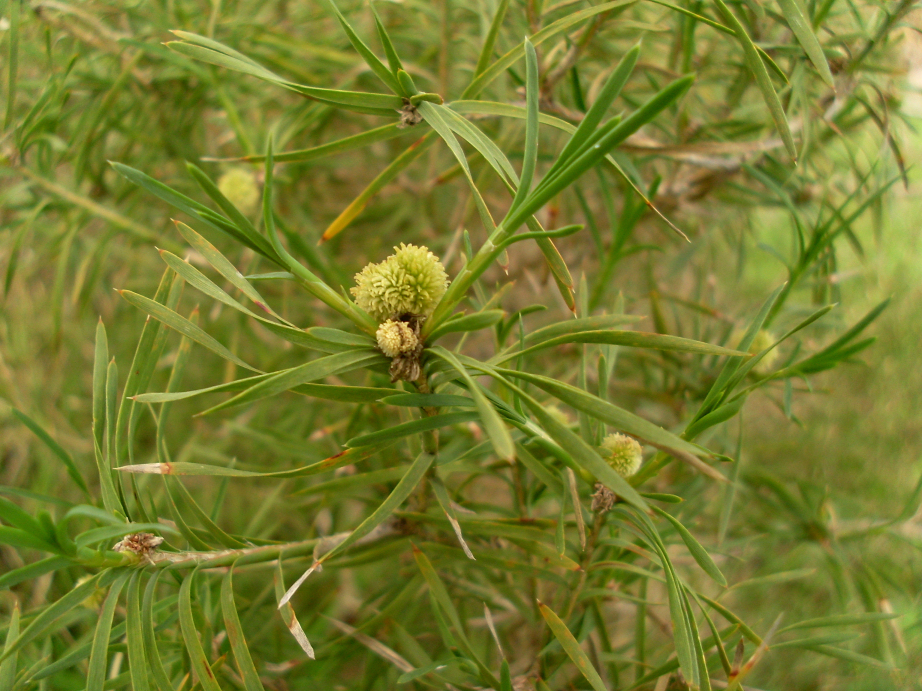

Scientific classification
- Kingdom: Plantae
- Clade: Tracheophytes
- Clade: Angiosperms
- Clade: Monocots
- Order: Asparagales
- Family: Asparagaceae
- Subfamily: Lomandroideae
- Genus: Acanthocarpus
- Species: A. preissii

Binomial name
- Acanthocarpus preissii Lehm.

= Acanthocarpus preissii =

Species of flowering plant

Acanthocarpus preissii is a rhizomatous perennial flowering plant in the family Asparagaceae. It occurs on coastal dunes in Western Australia. White flowers appear between April and May in the species' native range.
